= Recrystallization (geology) =

Crystallization

Fundamentals
- Crystal; Crystal structure; Nucleation

Concepts
- Crystallization; Crystal growth; Recrystallization; Seed crystal; Protocrystalline; Single crystal

Methods and technology
- Boules; Bridgman–Stockbarger method; Van Arkel–de Boer process; Czochralski method; Epitaxy; Flux method; Fractional crystallization; Fractional freezing; Hydrothermal synthesis; Kyropoulos method; Laser-heated pedestal growth; Lely method; Micro-pulling-down; Shaping processes in crystal growth; Skull crucible; Verneuil method; Zone melting

In geology, solid-state recrystallization is a metamorphic process that occurs under high temperatures and pressures where atoms of minerals are reorganized by diffusion and/or dislocation glide. During this process, the physical structure of the minerals is altered while the composition remains unchanged. This is in contrast to metasomatism, which is the chemical alteration of a rock by hydrothermal and other fluids.

Solid-state recrystallization can be illustrated by observing how snow recrystallizes to ice. When snow is subjected to varying temperatures and pressures, individual snowflakes undergo a physical transformation but their composition remains the same. Limestone is a sedimentary rock that undergoes metamorphic recrystallization to form marble, and clays can recrystallize to muscovite mica.
