= Fractional crystallization (geology) =

Process of rock formation

Crystallization

Fundamentals
- Crystal; Crystal structure; Nucleation

Concepts
- Crystallization; Crystal growth; Recrystallization; Seed crystal; Protocrystalline; Single crystal

Methods and technology
- Boules; Bridgman–Stockbarger method; Van Arkel–de Boer process; Czochralski method; Epitaxy; Flux method; Fractional crystallization; Fractional freezing; Hydrothermal synthesis; Kyropoulos method; Laser-heated pedestal growth; Micro-pulling-down; Shaping processes in crystal growth; Skull crucible; Verneuil method; Zone melting

Schematic diagrams showing the principles behind fractional crystallisation in a magma. While cooling, the magma evolves in composition because different minerals crystallize from the melt. 1: olivine crystallizes; 2: olivine and pyroxene crystallize; 3: pyroxene and plagioclase crystallize; 4: plagioclase crystallizes. At the bottom of the magma reservoir, a cumulate rock forms.

Fractional crystallization, or crystal fractionation, is one of the most important geochemical and physical processes operating within crust and mantle of a rocky planetary body, such as the Earth. It is important in the formation of igneous rocks because it is one of the main processes of magmatic differentiation. Fractional crystallization is also important in the formation of sedimentary evaporite rocks.

== Igneous rocks ==
Fractional crystallization is the removal and segregation from a melt of mineral precipitates; except in special cases, removal of the crystals changes the composition of the magma. In essence, fractional crystallization is the removal of early formed crystals from an originally homogeneous magma (for example, by gravity settling) so that these crystals are prevented from further reaction with the residual melt. The composition of the remaining melt becomes relatively depleted in some components and enriched in others, resulting in the precipitation of a sequence of different minerals.

Fractional crystallization in silicate melts (magmas) is complex compared to crystallization in chemical systems at constant pressure and composition, because changes in pressure and composition can have dramatic effects on magma evolution. Addition and loss of water, carbon dioxide, and oxygen are among the compositional changes that must be considered. For example, the partial pressure (fugacity) of water in silicate melts can be of prime importance, as in near-solidus crystallization of magmas of granite composition. The crystallization sequence of oxide minerals such as magnetite and ulvospinel is sensitive to the oxygen fugacity of melts, and separation of the oxide phases can be an important control of silica concentration in the evolving magma, and may be important in andesite genesis.

Experiments have provided many examples of the complexities that control which mineral is crystallized first as the melt cools down past the liquidus.

One example concerns crystallization of melts that form mafic and ultramafic rocks. MgO and SiO_{2} concentrations in melts are among the variables that determine whether forsterite olivine or enstatite pyroxene is precipitated, but the water content and pressure are also important. In some compositions, at high pressures without water crystallization of enstatite is favored, but in the presence of water at high pressures, olivine is favored.

Granitic magmas provide additional examples of how melts of generally similar composition and temperature, but at different pressure, may crystallize different minerals. Pressure determines the maximum water content of a magma of granite composition. High-temperature fractional crystallization of relatively water-poor granite magmas may produce single-alkali-feldspar granite, and lower-temperature crystallization of relatively water-rich magma may produce two-feldspar granite.

During the process of fractional crystallization, melts become enriched in incompatible elements. Hence, knowledge of the crystallization sequence is critical in understanding how melt compositions evolve. Textures of rocks provide insights, as documented in the early 1900s by Bowen's reaction series. An example of such texture, related to fractioned crystallization, is intergranular (also known as intercumulus) textures that develop wherever a mineral crystallizes later than the surrounding matrix, hence filling the left-over interstitial space. Various oxides of chromium, iron and titanium show such textures, such as intergranular chromite in a siliceous matrix. Experimentally-determined phase diagrams for simple mixtures provide insights into general principles. Numerical calculations with special software have become increasingly able to simulate natural processes accurately.

== Sedimentary rocks ==
Fractional crystallization is important in the formation of sedimentary evaporite rocks.

== See also ==
- Cumulate rock – Igneous rocks formed by the accumulation of crystals from a magma either by settling or floating.
- Flow banding – Bands or layers that can sometimes be seen in rock that formed from magma
- Fractional crystallization (chemistry) – Method for refining substances based on differences in their solubility
- Igneous differentiation – Geologic process in formation of some igneous rocks
- Layered intrusion – large sill-like body of igneous rock
