= Lely method =

Crystal growth technology

Crystallization

Fundamentals
- Crystal; Crystal structure; Nucleation

Concepts
- Crystallization; Crystal growth; Recrystallization; Seed crystal; Protocrystalline; Single crystal

Methods and technology
- Boules; Bridgman–Stockbarger method; Van Arkel–de Boer process; Czochralski method; Epitaxy; Flux method; Fractional crystallization; Fractional freezing; Hydrothermal synthesis; Kyropoulos method; Laser-heated pedestal growth; Lely method; Micro-pulling-down; Shaping processes in crystal growth; Skull crucible; Verneuil method; Zone melting

A diagram of the modified Lely method, showing a graphite crucible surrounded by induction coils for heating. Silicon carbide charge is sublimated from the bottom of the chamber and deposited on the upper lid, which is cooler.

The Lely method, also known as the Lely process or Lely technique, is a crystal growth technology based on physical vapor deposition, used for producing silicon carbide crystals for the semiconductor industry.

The patent for this method was filed in the Netherlands in 1954 and in the United States in 1955 by Jan Anthony Lely of Philips Electronics. The patent was subsequently granted on 30 September 1958, then was refined by D. R. Hamilton et al. in 1960, and by V. P. Novikov and V. I. Ionov in 1968.

== Overview ==
The Lely method produces bulk silicon carbide crystals through the process of sublimation. Compared to the Czochralski method which produces single crystals from a molten liquid, sublimation is required for SiC since it does not melt but rather decomposes into gas form at high temperatures.

Silicon carbide powder is loaded into a graphite crucible, which is purged with argon gas and heated to approximately 2,500 °C (4,530 °F). The silicon carbide near the outer walls of the crucible sublimes and is deposited on a graphite rod near the center of the crucible, which is at a lower temperature.

Several modified versions of the Lely process exist, most commonly the silicon carbide is heated from the bottom end rather than the walls of the crucible, and deposited on the lid. Other modifications include varying the temperature, temperature gradient, argon pressure, and geometry of the system. Typically, an induction furnace is used to achieve the required temperatures of 1,800–2,600 °C (3,270–4,710 °F).

== See also ==
- Acheson process
- Czochralski method
- Sublimation sandwich method
