= Sublimation sandwich method =

Si is silicon, C is carbon, SiC_{2} is silicon dicarbide, Si_{2}C is disilicon carbide, Ar is gaseous argon

The sublimation sandwich method (also called the sublimation sandwich process and the sublimation sandwich technique) is a kind of physical vapor deposition used for creating man-made crystals. Silicon carbide is the most common crystal grown this way, though other crystals may also be created with it (notably gallium nitride).

In this method, the environment around a single crystal or a polycrystalline plate is filled with vapor heated to between 1600°C and 2100°C. Changes to this environment can affect the gas phase stoichiometry. The source-to-crystal distance is kept very low, between 0.02mm to 0.03mm. Parameters that can affect crystal growth include source-to-substrate distance, temperature gradient, and the presence of tantalum for gathering excess carbon. High growth rates are the result of small source-to-seed distances combined with a large heat flux onto a small amount of source material with no more than a moderate temperature difference between the substrate and the source (0.5-10°C). The growth of large boules, however, remains quite difficult using this method, and it is better suited to the creation of epitaxial films with uniform polytype structures. Ultimately, samples with a thickness of up to 500 μm can be produced using this method.

== See also ==
- Lely method
- Czochralski process
- Mokhov, E. et al.: “Growth of Silicon Carbide Bulk Crystals by the Sublimation Sandwich Method”, Elsevier Science S.A., 1997, pp. 317-323
