= Recrystallization =

Recrystallization may refer to:

- Recrystallization (chemistry)
- Recrystallization (geology)
- Recrystallization (metallurgy)
