= Donald C. Stockbarger =

American physicist (1895–1952)

- Born: October 19, 1895
- Died: February 23, 1952 (aged 56); Belmont, Massachusetts
- Education: Massachusetts Institute of Technology
- Known for: Bridgman–Stockbarger method
- Scientific career
- Fields: Physics
- Workplaces: Massachusetts Institute of Technology

Donald C. Stockbarger (October 19, 1895 – February 23, 1952) was an American physicist known for his contributions to experimental methods in crystal growth. He is best remembered for refining the technique developed by Percy Williams Bridgman, thereby co-naming the Bridgman–Stockbarger method—a process widely used in growing high-quality single crystals for semiconductor and materials science applications.

== Biography ==
=== Early life and education ===
Little is documented about Stockbarger's early life. He pursued his higher education at the Massachusetts Institute of Technology (MIT), where he received both his undergraduate degree (1919) and his Doctor of Science (1926).

=== Academic and research career ===
Stockbarger joined the MIT Department of Physics in the early 1920s. Over his long career at MIT he advanced from assistant to associate professor, dedicating his research to solid-state physics and the development of crystal growth techniques. His innovative modification to the conventional Bridgman method involved the introduction of a controlled temperature gradient—achieved by using a baffle to separate two thermal zones. This improvement provided better control over the melt/crystal interface during directional solidification, and the process subsequently became known as the Bridgman–Stockbarger method.

=== Death ===
Donald C. Stockbarger died on February 23, 1952, in his home in Belmont, Massachusetts. An MIT News Release from February 25, 1952, noted his passing and highlighted his international reputation for advancing crystal growth techniques.

== See also ==
- Bridgman–Stockbarger method
- Percy Williams Bridgman
