= Fractional crystallization (chemistry) =

Method for refining substances based on differences in their solubility

Crystallization

Fundamentals
- Crystal; Crystal structure; Nucleation

Concepts
- Crystallization; Crystal growth; Recrystallization; Seed crystal; Protocrystalline; Single crystal

Methods and technology
- Boules; Bridgman–Stockbarger method; Van Arkel–de Boer process; Czochralski method; Epitaxy; Flux method; Fractional crystallization; Fractional freezing; Hydrothermal synthesis; Kyropoulos method; Laser-heated pedestal growth; Lely method; Micro-pulling-down; Shaping processes in crystal growth; Skull crucible; Verneuil method; Zone melting

In chemistry, fractional crystallization is a stage-wise separation technique that relies on the liquid–solid phase change. This technique fractionates via differences in crystallization temperature and enables the purification of multi-component mixtures, as long as none of the constituents can act as solvents to the others. Due to the high selectivity of the solid–liquid equilibrium, very high purities can be achieved for the selected component.

== Principle of separation ==
The crystallization process starts with the partial freezing of the initial liquid mixture by slowly decreasing its temperature. The frozen solid phase subsequently has a different composition than the remaining liquid. This is the fundamental physical principle behind the melt fractionating process and quite comparable to distillation, which operates between a liquid and the gas phase.

The crystals will grow on a cooled surface or alternatively as a suspension in the liquid. The heat released by the solidification process is withdrawn through a cooling surface or via the liquid. In theory, 100% of the product could be solidified and recovered. In practice, various strategies such as partial melting of the solid fraction (sweating) need to be applied in order to reach high purity levels.

== Advantages ==
Fractional crystallization has various advantages over other separation technologies. First of all, it makes the purification of close boilers possible. This allows for very high purities even for challenging components. Furthermore, because of the lower operating temperature, the thermal stress applied to the product is very low. This is in particular relevant for products that would otherwise oligomerize or degrade. Next, fractional crystallization is usually an inherently safe technology, because it operates at low pressures and low temperatures. Also, it does not use any solvents and is emission-free. Finally, since the latent heat of solidification is 3–6x lower than the heat of evaporation, the energy consumption is – in comparison to distillation – much lower.

== Process steps ==
Fractional crystallization involves several key steps:

1. Crystallization: This is the initial phase where the material to be purified is cooled. As it cools, high-purity crystals begin to form on the cooling surface. The purity is achieved because the impurities tend to remain in the liquid phase rather than being incorporated into the crystal structure.
2. Draining: After the formation of the crystals, the next step is to remove the residual liquid that contains a higher concentration of impurities. This process of draining helps to separate the pure crystals from the impure liquid.
3. Sweating: This phase is a controlled partial melting process. It further purifies the product by melting only a small portion of the crystal. The melting causes the impurities trapped within or between the crystal structures to be released and separated. Since impurities cause freezing-point depression, less pure material tends to melt first, aiding in separation.
4. Total Melting: In the final step, the remaining crystallized material, which is now the purified product, is completely melted. This total melting facilitates the removal of the pure substance from the crystallization equipment and prepares it for downstream processing.

== Crystallizers ==
There are three different fractional crystallization technologies available:

=== Falling-film ===
In the falling-film crystallizer, crystals grow from a melt that forms a thin film along the inside of cooled tubes. A concurrent cooling medium flows on the outside of these tubes. This arrangement allows for reproducible and high transfer rates of heat, facilitating the growth of crystals from the falling film of melt. The solid–liquid separation of the resulting slurry can be accomplished using a wash column or a centrifuge. This technology is more complex than others but offers the advantage of high separation efficiency and very high purities. A typical feed has concentrations between 90–99%, which is purified up to 99.99 wt.-% or greater. For example, glacial acrylic acid, optical grade bisphenol-A and battery grade ethylene carbonate can be purified to their highest grade using a falling-film crystallizer.

=== Static ===
The static crystallizer allows crystals to grow from a stagnant melt, making it a versatile and robust technology. It can purify highly challenging products, including those with most challenging properties, such as high viscosities and high or low melting points. Examples of applications include isopulegol, phosphoric acid, wax and paraffins, anthracene / carbazole and even satellite-grade hydrazine.

=== Suspension ===
In suspension crystallization, crystals are generated on a cooling surface and then scraped off to continue growing in size within a stirred vessel in suspension or slurry. The solid–liquid separation is performed either through a wash-column or a centrifuge. This method is more complex to operate, but offers the advantage of a high separation efficiency, which translates to considerable energy savings. Examples of applications include paraxylene, halogenated aromatics, and also aqueous feeds.

== See also ==
- Cold Water Extraction
- Fractional crystallization (geology)
- Fractional freezing
- Laser-heated pedestal growth
- Pumpable ice technology
- Recrystallization (chemistry)
- Seed crystal
- Single crystal
- Melt crystallization
