= Van Arkel–de Boer process =

Process for the commercial production of pure titanium and zirconium

Crystallization

Fundamentals
- Crystal; Crystal structure; Nucleation

Concepts
- Crystallization; Crystal growth; Recrystallization; Seed crystal; Protocrystalline; Single crystal

Methods and technology
- Boules; Bridgman–Stockbarger method; Van Arkel–de Boer process; Czochralski method; Epitaxy; Flux method; Fractional crystallization; Fractional freezing; Hydrothermal synthesis; Kyropoulos method; Laser-heated pedestal growth; Lely method; Micro-pulling-down; Shaping processes in crystal growth; Skull crucible; Verneuil method; Zone melting

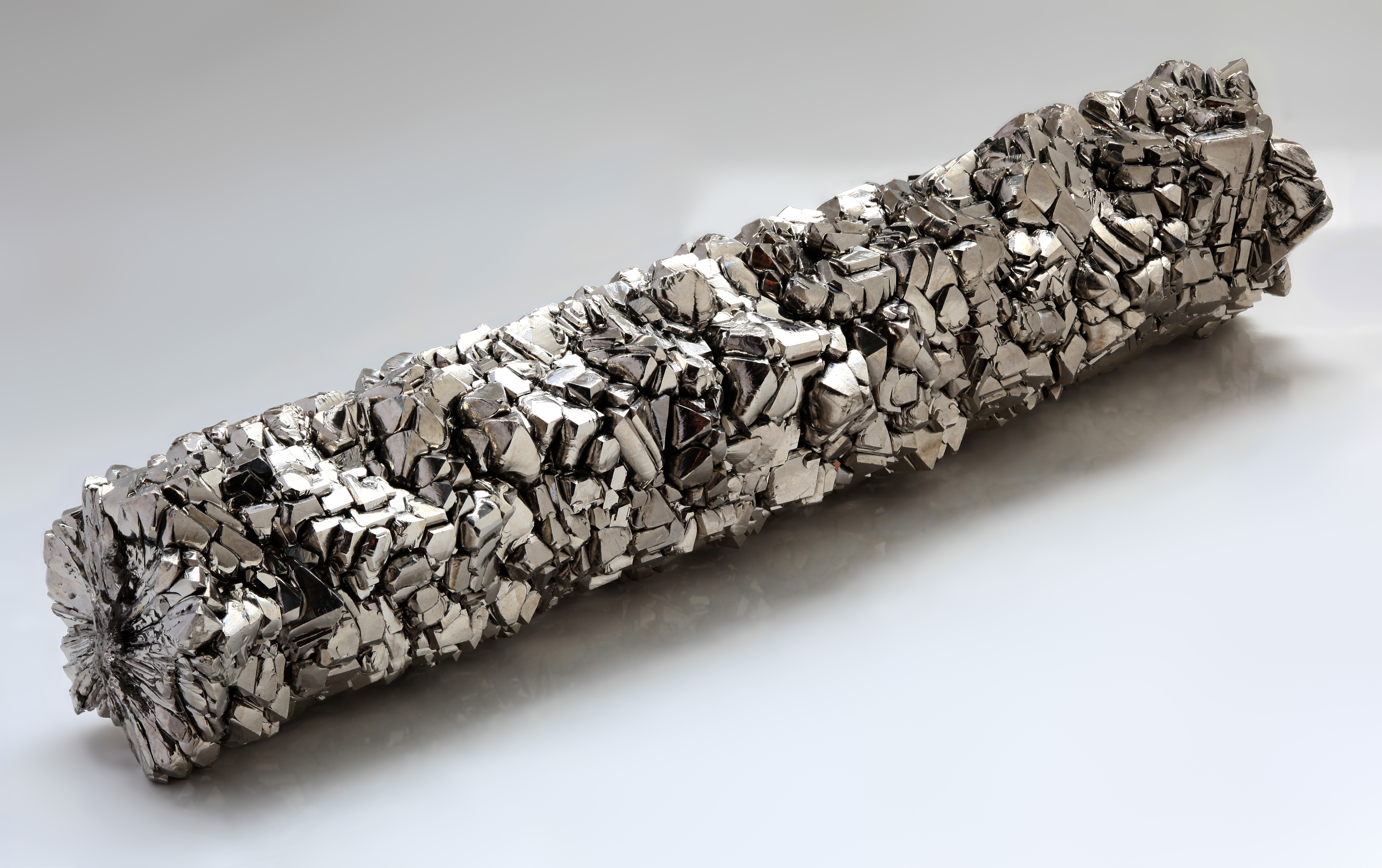
A 5.5" long high purity 99.995% titanium crystal bar weighing 283 g made by this process during the Soviet era at the URALREDMET plant in Yekaterinburg

The van Arkel–de Boer process, also known as the iodide process or crystal-bar process, was the first industrial process for the commercial production of pure ductile titanium, zirconium and some other metals. It was developed by Anton Eduard van Arkel and Jan Hendrik de Boer in 1925 for Philips Nv. Now, it is used in the production of small quantities of ultrapure titanium and zirconium. It primarily involves the formation of the metal iodides and their subsequent decomposition to yield pure metal, for example, at one of the Allegheny Technologies' Albany plants.

This process was superseded commercially by the Kroll process (based on the reduction of titanium tetrachloride by metallic magnesium).

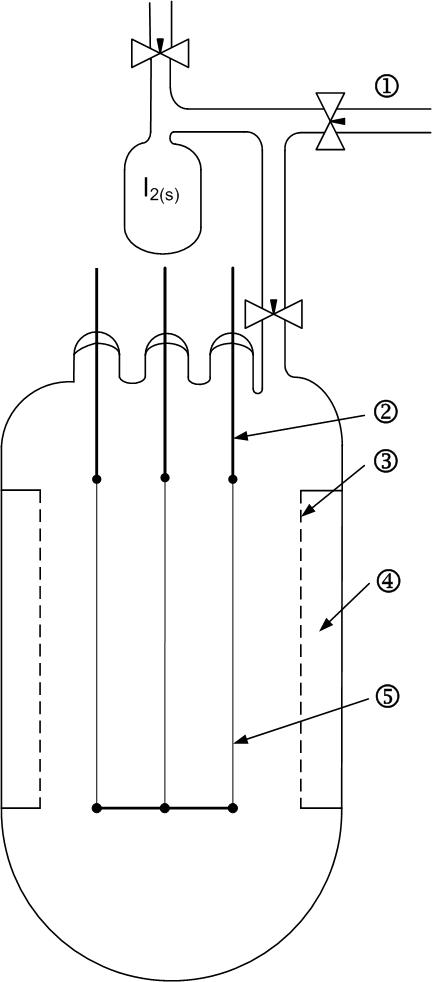
An apparatus used for the process. The main body is quartz glass. (1) to vacuum pump, (2) 6 mm molybdenum electrode, (3) molybdenum net, (4) chamber for the raw metal, (5) tungsten wire

== Process ==
As seen in the diagram, impure titanium, zirconium, hafnium, vanadium, thorium or protactinium is heated in an evacuated vessel with a halogen at 50–250 °C. The patent specifically involved the intermediacy of TiI_{4} and ZrI_{4}, which were volatilized (leaving impurities as solid).

At atmospheric pressure TiI_{4} melts at 150 °C and boils at 377 °C, while ZrI_{4} melts at 499 °C and boils at 600 °C. The boiling points are lower at reduced pressure. The gaseous metal tetraiodide is decomposed on a white hot tungsten filament (1400 °C). As more metal is deposited the filament conducts better and thus a greater electric current is required to maintain the temperature of the filament. The process can be performed in the span of several hours or several weeks, depending on the particular setup.

Generally, the crystal bar process can be performed using any number of metals using whichever halogen or combination of halogens is most appropriate for that sort of transport mechanism, based on the reactivities involved. The only metals it has been used to purify on an industrial scale are titanium, zirconium and hafnium, and in fact it is still in use today on a much smaller scale for special purity needs.
