= Fractional freezing =

Separating components of a mixture by their melting points

Crystallization

Fundamentals
- Crystal; Crystal structure; Nucleation

Concepts
- Crystallization; Crystal growth; Recrystallization; Seed crystal; Protocrystalline; Single crystal

Methods and technology
- Boules; Bridgman–Stockbarger method; Van Arkel–de Boer process; Czochralski method; Epitaxy; Flux method; Fractional crystallization; Fractional freezing; Hydrothermal synthesis; Kyropoulos method; Laser-heated pedestal growth; Lely method; Micro-pulling-down; Shaping processes in crystal growth; Skull crucible; Verneuil method; Zone melting

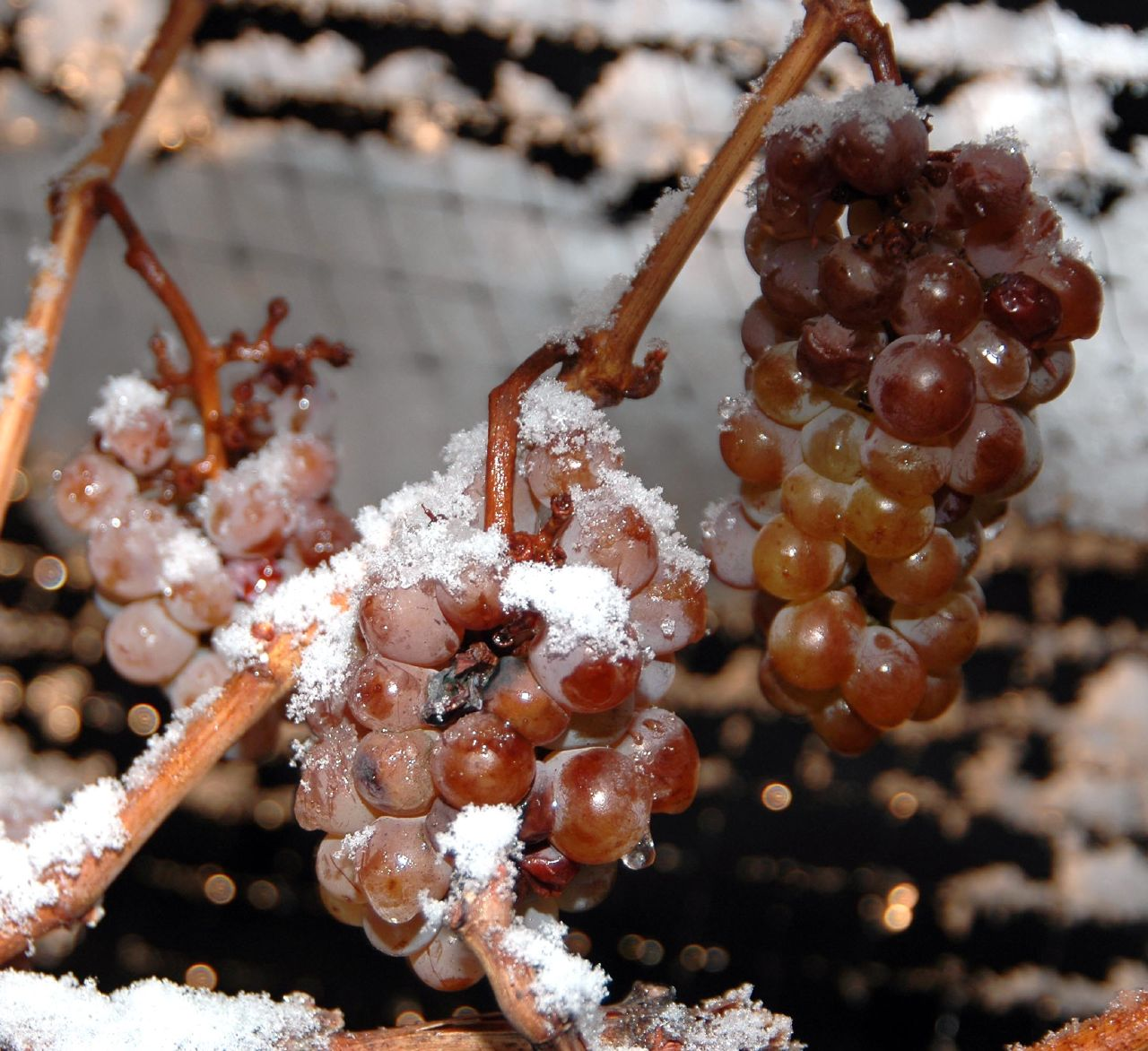
Fractional freezing of grapes to concentrate grape sugar for making ice wine

Fractional freezing is a process used in process engineering and chemistry to separate substances with different melting points. It can be done by partial melting of a solid, for example in zone refining of silicon or metals, or by partial crystallization of a liquid, as in freeze distillation, also called normal freezing or progressive freezing. The initial sample is thus fractionated (separated into fractions).

Partial crystallization can also be achieved by adding a dilute solvent to the mixture, and cooling and concentrating the mixture by evaporating the solvent, a process called solution crystallization. Fractional freezing is generally used to produce ultra-pure solids, or to concentrate heat-sensitive liquids.

== Freeze distillation ==
Despite the name, freeze distillation is not technically a form of distillation, but rather a condensation method. The name 'freeze distillation' remains because it achieves the same end result of higher ABV.

Freeze distillation removes frozen solvent (water) and leaves the solute (ethanol), making a higher ABV due to less solvent. True distillation refers to when ethanol is extracted from a solution and re-formed into a more potent liquid.

Ethanol (drinking alcohol) is miscible and soluble with water when both are liquid, but ethanol is not soluble in water's solid form ice, and has a much lower freezing point than water. Therefore, when a mixture of ethanol and water is cooled below water's freezing point (0°C or 32°F), the water will freeze, but will crystallize into pure ice, leaving behind the ethanol, since the ethanol is still liquid at these temperatures (ethanol's freezing point is -123 °C). When this mass of ice is removed from the solution, the remaining liquid has the same ethanol, but less water to be divided among, which raises the ABV of the solution.

The two phases can then be separated by filtration or decanting. The temperature at which water ice starts to precipitate depends on the ethanol concentration. Consequently, at a given temperature and ethanol concentration, the freezing process will reach an equilibrium at a specific ratio of water ice and enriched ethanol solution with a specific ethanol concentration. The temperatures and mixing ratios of these phase equilibria can be read from the phase diagram of ethanol and water. The maximum enrichment of ethanol in the liquid phase is reached at the eutectic point of ethanol and water, approximately 92.4% ethanol by weight at −123 °C.

The best-known freeze-distilled beverages are applejack and ice beer. Ice wine is the result of a similar process, but in this case, the freezing happens before the fermentation, and thus it is sugar, not alcohol, that gets concentrated.

== Purification of solids ==
When a pure solid is desired, two possible situations can occur. If the contaminant is soluble in the desired solid, a multiple stage fractional freezing is required, analogous to multistage distillation. If, however, a eutectic system forms (analogous to an azeotrope in distillation), a very pure solid can be recovered, as long as the liquid is not at its eutectic composition (in which case a mixed solid forms, which can be hard to separate) or above its eutectic composition (in which case the undesired solid forms).

== Concentration of liquids ==
When the requirement is to concentrate a liquid phase, fractional freezing can be useful due to its simplicity. Fractional freezing is also used in the production of fruit juice concentrates and other heat-sensitive liquids, as it does not involve heating the liquid (as happens during evaporation).

=== Desalination ===
Fractional freezing can be used to desalinate sea water. In a process that naturally occurs with sea ice, frozen salt water, when partially melted, leaves behind ice that is of a much lower salt content. Because sodium chloride lowers the melting point of water, the salt in sea water tends to be forced out of pure water while freezing, called brine rejection. Large lakes of higher salinity water, called polynyas, form in the middle of floes, and the water eventually sinks to the bottom. Likewise, the frozen water with the highest concentration of salt melts first. Either method decreases the salinity of the remaining frozen water, and after multiple runs the results can be drinkable.

=== Alcoholic beverages ===
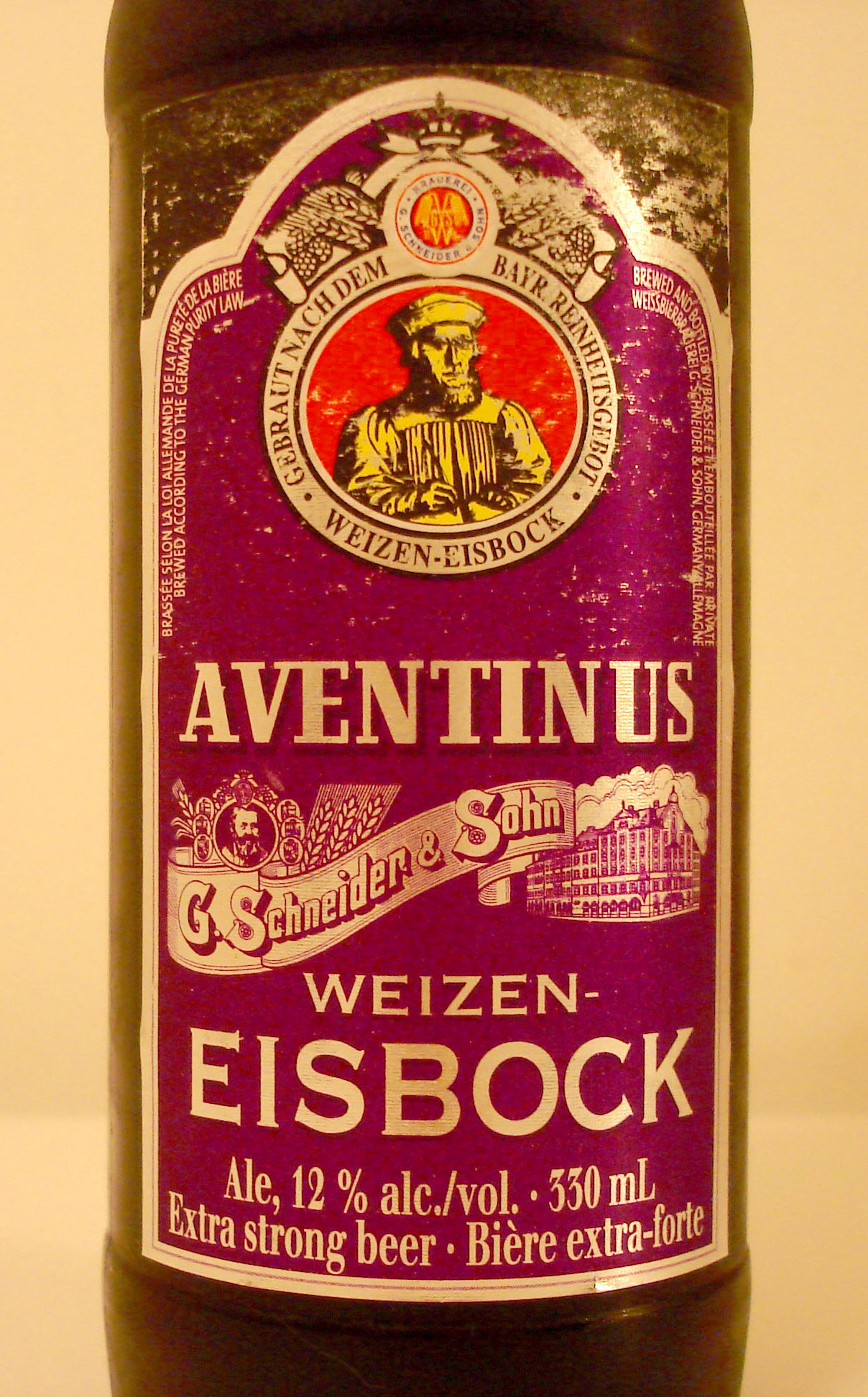
Eisbock beer (12% alcohol) created via freeze distillation of doppelbock beer. Barrels of beer were originally left outdoors to partially freeze, then the ice removed.

Fractional freezing can be used as a simple method to increase the alcohol concentration in fermented alcoholic beverages, a process sometimes called freeze distillation. Examples are applejack, made from hard cider, and ice beer. In practice, while not able to produce an alcohol concentration comparable to distillation, this technique can achieve some concentration with far less effort than any practical distillation apparatus would require. The danger of fractional freezing of alcoholic beverages is that it does not remove impurities, unlike (heat) distillation. Thus, fractional freezing may increase the ratio of impurities to the total volume of the beverage (though not necessarily the ratio of impurities to the amount of ethanol). This concentration may cause side effects to the drinker, leading to intense hangovers and a condition known as "apple palsy" (although this term has also simply been used to refer to intoxication, especially from applejack.)

=== Alternative fuels ===
Fractional freezing is commonly used as a simple method to reduce the gel point of biodiesel and other alternative diesel fuels, whereby esters of higher gel point are removed from esters of lower gel point through cold filtering, or other methods to reduce the subsequent alternative fuel gel point of the fuel blend. This process employs fuel stratification whereby components in the fuel blend develop a higher specific gravity as they approach their respective gel points and thus sink to the bottom of the container, where they can be removed.

== See also ==
- Fractional crystallization (chemistry)
- Laser-heated pedestal growth
- Pumpable ice technology
- Zone melting
