= Skull crucible =

Method of creating Cubic Zirconia

Crystallization

Fundamentals
- Crystal; Crystal structure; Nucleation

Concepts
- Crystallization; Crystal growth; Recrystallization; Seed crystal; Protocrystalline; Single crystal

Methods and technology
- Boules; Bridgman–Stockbarger method; Van Arkel–de Boer process; Czochralski method; Epitaxy; Flux method; Fractional crystallization; Fractional freezing; Hydrothermal synthesis; Kyropoulos method; Laser-heated pedestal growth; Lely method; Micro-pulling-down; Shaping processes in crystal growth; Skull crucible; Verneuil method; Zone melting

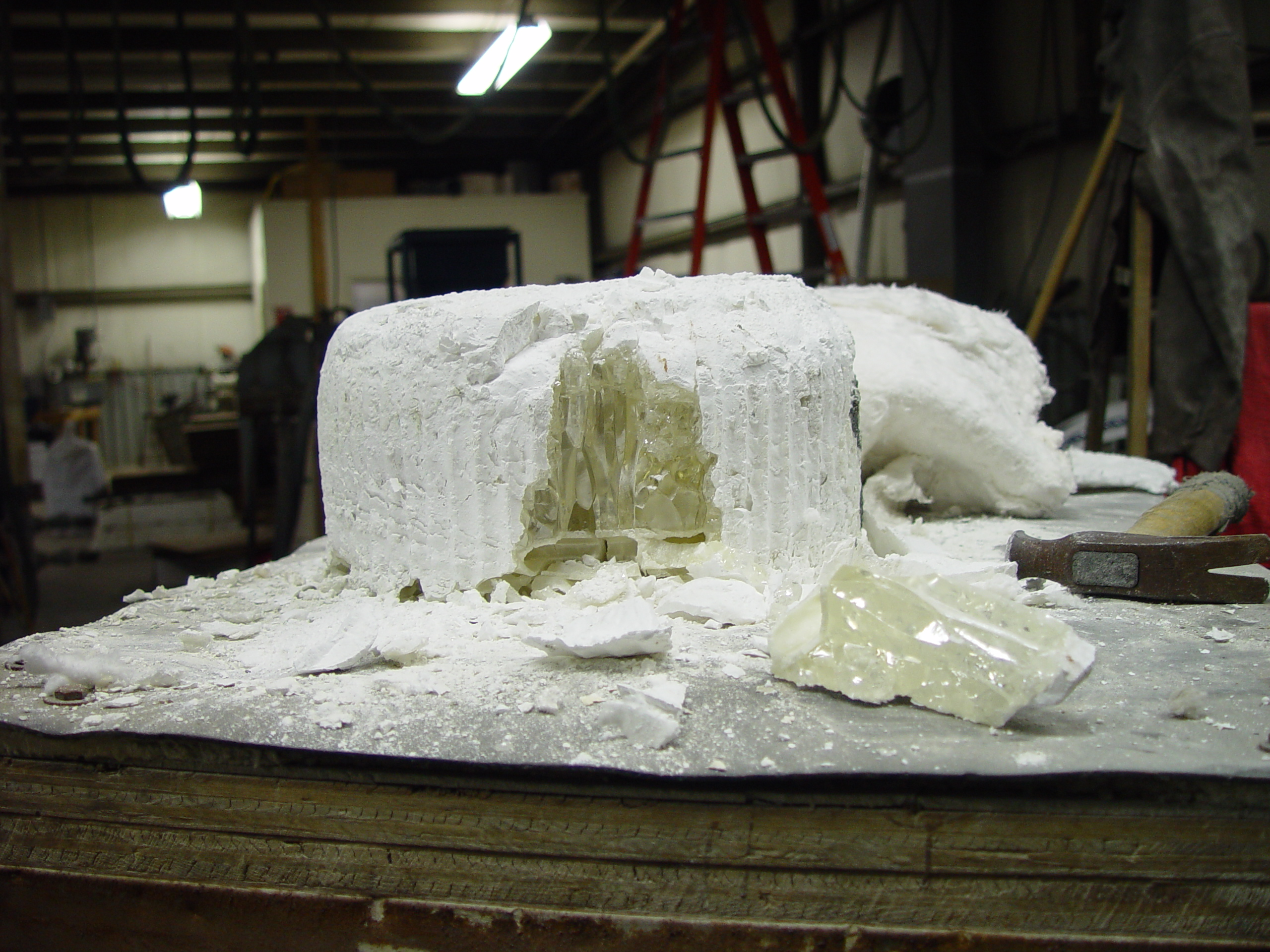
Cubic zirconia "run" being opened

The skull crucible process was developed at the Lebedev Physical Institute in Moscow to manufacture cubic zirconia. It was invented to solve the problem of cubic zirconia's melting-point being too high for even platinum crucibles.

In essence, by heating only the center of a volume of cubic zirconia, the material forms its own "crucible" from its cooler outer layers. The term "skull" refers to these outer layers forming a shell enclosing the molten volume. Zirconium oxide powder is heated then gradually allowed to cool. Heating is accomplished by radio frequency induction using a coil wrapped around the apparatus. The outside of the device is water-cooled in order to keep the radio frequency coil from melting and also to cool the outside of the zirconium oxide and thus maintain the shape of the zirconium powder.

Since zirconium oxide in its solid state does not conduct electricity, a piece of zirconium metal is placed inside the gob of zirconium oxide. As the zirconium melts it oxidizes and blends with the now molten zirconium oxide, a conductor, and is heated by radio frequency induction.

When the zirconium oxide is melted on the inside (but not completely, since the outside needs to remain solid) the amplitude of the RF induction coil is gradually reduced and crystals form as the material cools. Normally this would form a monoclinic crystal system of zirconium oxide.

In order to maintain a cubic crystal system a stabilizer is added, magnesium oxide, calcium oxide or yttrium oxide as well as any material to color the crystal. After the mixture cools the outer shell is broken off and the interior of the gob is then used to manufacture gemstones.
