= Seed crystal =

Small piece of a single crystal used to initiate growth of a larger crystal

Crystallization

Fundamentals
- Crystal; Crystal structure; Nucleation

Concepts
- Crystallization; Crystal growth; Recrystallization; Seed crystal; Protocrystalline; Single crystal

Methods and technology
- Boules; Bridgman–Stockbarger method; Van Arkel–de Boer process; Czochralski method; Epitaxy; Flux method; Fractional crystallization; Fractional freezing; Hydrothermal synthesis; Kyropoulos method; Laser-heated pedestal growth; Lely method; Micro-pulling-down; Shaping processes in crystal growth; Skull crucible; Verneuil method; Zone melting

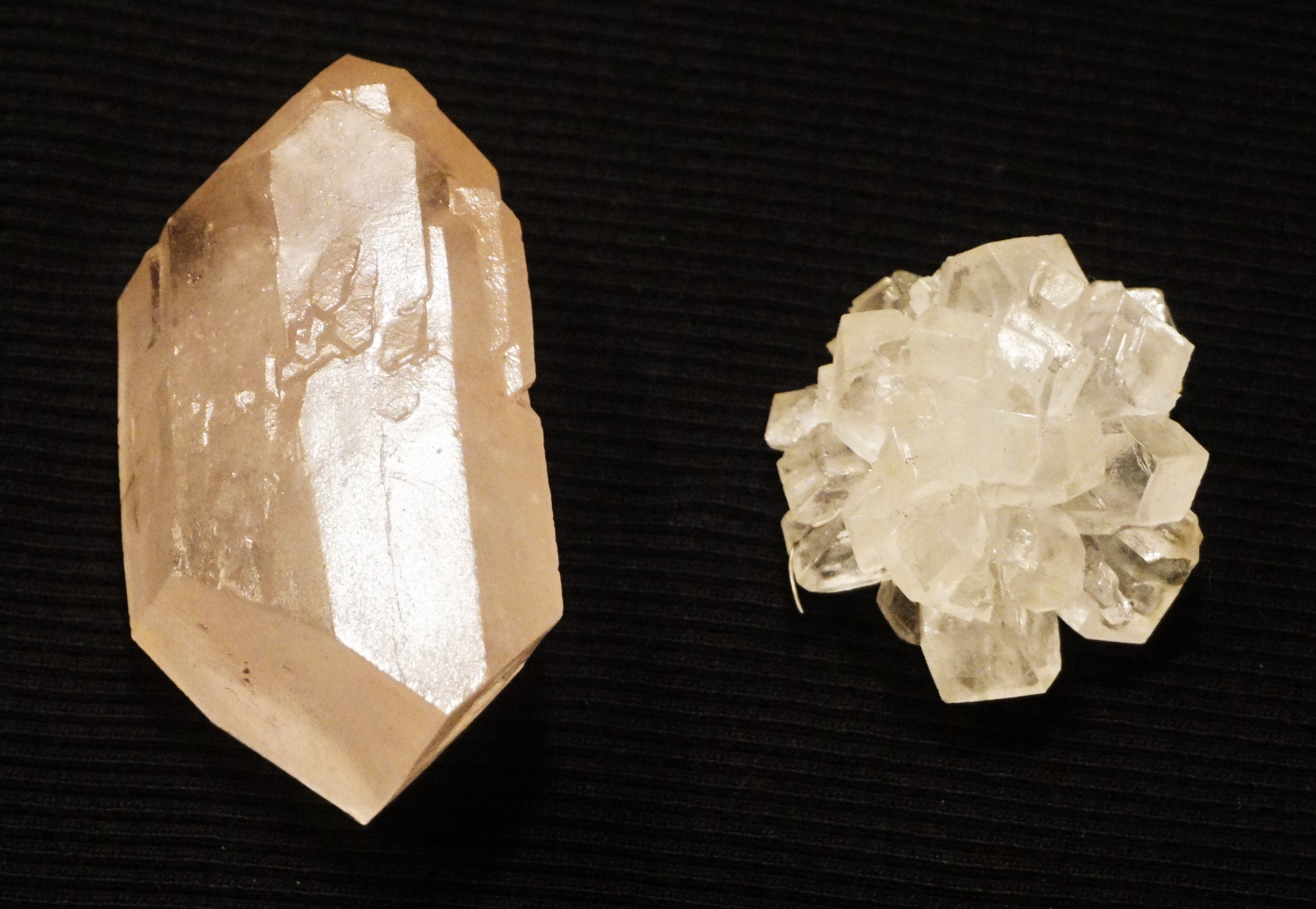
Right: Multiple individual crystals grown from a sugar cube. Left: A single crystal grown from a seed from the right crystal formation.

A seed crystal is a small piece of single crystal or polycrystal material from which a large crystal of typically the same material is grown in a laboratory. Used to replicate material, the use of seed crystal to promote growth avoids the otherwise slow randomness of natural crystal growth, and allows manufacture on a scale suitable for industry.

== Crystal enlargement ==
The large crystal can be grown by dipping the seed into a supersaturated solution, into molten material that is then cooled, or by growth on the seed face by passing vapor of the material to be grown over it.

== Theory ==
The theory behind this effect is thought to derive from the physical intermolecular interaction that occurs between compounds in a supersaturated solution (or possibly vapor). In solution, liberated (soluble) molecules (solute) are free to move about in random flow. This random flow permits for the possibility of two or more molecular compounds to interact. This interaction can potentiate intermolecular forces between the separate molecules and form a basis for a crystal lattice. The placement of a seed crystal into solution allows the recrystallization process to expedite by eliminating the need for random molecular collision or interaction. By introducing an already pre-formed basis of the target crystal to act upon, the intermolecular interactions are formed much more easily or readily, than relying on random flow. Often, this phase transition from solute in a solution to a crystal lattice will be referred to as nucleation. Seeding can therefore decrease the necessary amount of time needed for nucleation to occur in a recrystallization process and reduce the number of nucleation sites.

== Uses ==
One example where a seed crystal is used to grow large boules or ingots of a single crystal is the semiconductor industry where methods such as the Czochralski process or Bridgman technique are employed.

Also during the process of tempering chocolate, seed crystals can be used to promote the growth of favorable type V crystals.

== See also ==
- Crystal structure
- Crystallization
- Laser heated pedestal growth
- Micro-pulling-down
- Polycrystal
- Single crystal
- Wafer (electronics)
- Disappearing polymorphs
