= Hydrothermal synthesis =

Techniques for crystallizing substances

Crystallization

Fundamentals
- Crystal; Crystal structure; Nucleation

Concepts
- Crystallization; Crystal growth; Recrystallization; Seed crystal; Protocrystalline; Single crystal

Methods and technology
- Boules; Bridgman–Stockbarger method; Van Arkel–de Boer process; Czochralski method; Epitaxy; Flux method; Fractional crystallization; Fractional freezing; Hydrothermal synthesis; Kyropoulos method; Laser-heated pedestal growth; Lely method; Micro-pulling-down; Shaping processes in crystal growth; Skull crucible; Verneuil method; Zone melting

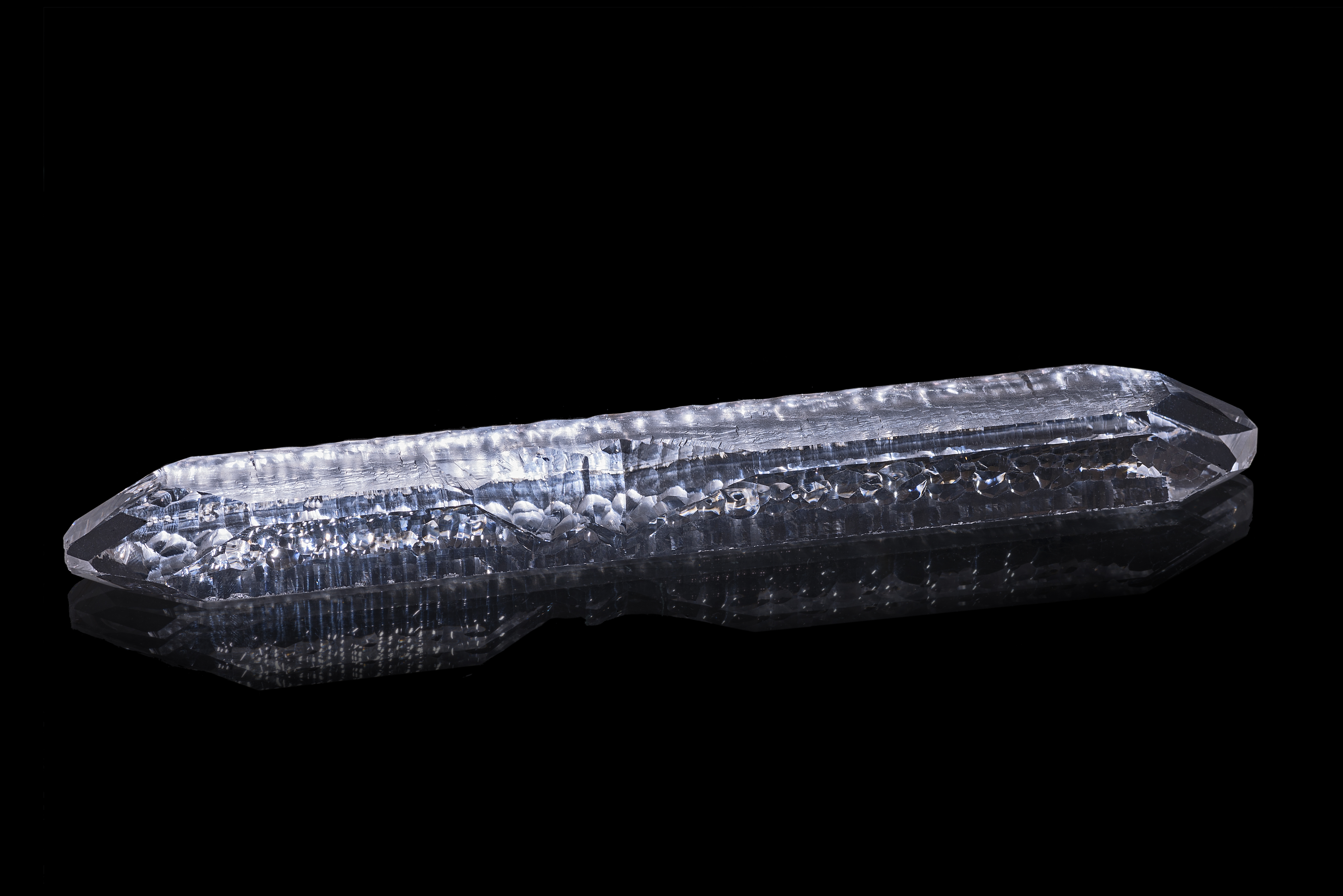
A synthetic quartz crystal grown by the hydrothermal method

Hydrothermal synthesis includes the various techniques of synthesizing substances from high-temperature aqueous solutions at high pressures; also termed "hydrothermal method". The term "hydrothermal" is of geologic origin. Geochemists and mineralogists have studied hydrothermal phase equilibria since the beginning of the twentieth century. George W. Morey at the Carnegie Institution and later, Percy W. Bridgman at Harvard University did much of the work to lay the foundations necessary to containment of reactive media in the temperature and pressure range where most of the hydrothermal work is conducted. In the broadest definition, a process is considered hydrothermal if it involves water temperatures above 100 °C (212 °F) and pressures above 1 atm.

In the context of material science, hydrothermal synthesis focuses on the production of single crystal. Under high temperature > (300 °C) and pressure (> 100 atm), ordinarily insoluble minerals become soluble in water. The crystal growth is performed in an apparatus consisting of a steel pressure vessel called an autoclave, in which the reactant ("nutrient") is supplied along with water. A temperature gradient is maintained between the opposite ends of the growth chamber. At the hotter end the nutrient solute dissolves, while at the cooler end it is deposited on a seed crystal, growing the desired crystal.

Advantages of the hydrothermal method over other types of crystal growth include the ability to create crystalline phases which are not stable at the melting point. Also, materials which have a high vapor pressure near their melting points can be grown by the hydrothermal method. The method is also particularly suitable for the growth of large good-quality crystals while maintaining control over their composition. Disadvantages of the method include the need of expensive autoclaves, and the impossibility of observing the crystal as it grows if a steel tube is used. There are autoclaves made out of thick walled glass, which can be used up to 300 °C and 10 bar.

== History ==
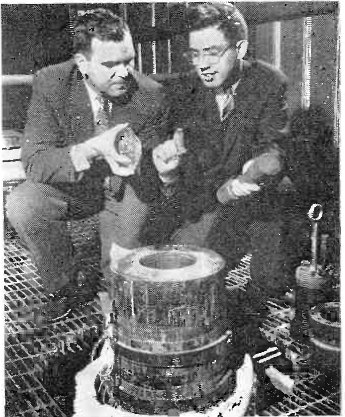
Synthetic quartz crystals produced in an autoclave at Western Electric's pilot hydrothermal quartz plant (1959)

The first report of the hydrothermal growth of crystals was by German geologist Karl Emil von Schafhäutl (1803–1890) in 1845: he grew microscopic quartz crystals in a pressure cooker. In 1848, Robert Bunsen reported growing crystals of barium and strontium carbonate at 200 °C and at pressures of 15 atmospheres, using sealed glass tubes and aqueous ammonium chloride ("Salmiak") as a solvent. In 1849 and 1851, French crystallographer Henri Hureau de Sénarmont (1808–1862) produced crystals of various minerals via hydrothermal synthesis. Later (1905) Giorgio Spezia (1842–1911) published reports on the growth of macroscopic crystals. He used solutions of sodium silicate, natural crystals as seeds and supply, and a silver-lined vessel. By heating the supply end of his vessel to 320–350 °C, and the other end to 165–180 °C, he obtained about 15 mm of new growth over a 200-day period. Unlike modern practice, the hotter part of the vessel was at the top. A shortage in the electronics industry of natural quartz crystals from Brazil during World War 2 led to postwar development of a commercial-scale hydrothermal process for culturing quartz crystals, by A. C. Walker and Ernie Buehler in 1950 at Bell Laboratories. Other notable contributions have been made by Nacken (1946), Hale (1948), Brown (1951), and Kohman (1955).

== Uses ==
A large number of compounds belonging to practically all classes have been synthesized under hydrothermal conditions: elements, simple and complex oxides, tungstates, molybdates, carbonates, silicates, germanates etc. Hydrothermal synthesis is commonly used to grow synthetic quartz, gems and other single crystals with commercial value. Some of the crystals that have been efficiently grown are emeralds, rubies, quartz, alexandrite and others. The method has proved to be extremely efficient both in the search for new compounds with specific physical properties and in the systematic physicochemical investigation of intricate multicomponent systems at elevated temperatures and pressures.

== Equipment for hydrothermal crystal growth ==
The crystallization vessels used are autoclaves. These are usually thick-walled steel cylinders with a hermetic seal which must withstand high temperatures and pressures for prolonged periods of time. Furthermore, the autoclave material must be inert with respect to the solvent. The closure is the most important element of the autoclave. Many designs have been developed for seals, the most famous being the Bridgman seal. In most cases, steel-corroding solutions are used in hydrothermal experiments. To prevent corrosion of the internal cavity of the autoclave, protective inserts are generally used. These may have the same shape as the autoclave and fit in the internal cavity (contact-type insert), or be "floating" type inserts which occupy only part of the autoclave interior. Inserts may be made of carbon-free iron, copper, silver, gold, platinum, titanium, glass (or quartz), or Teflon, depending on the temperature and solution used.

== Methods ==
=== Temperature-gradient method ===
This is the most extensively used method in hydrothermal synthesis and crystal growing. Supersaturation is achieved by reducing the temperature in the crystal growth zone. The nutrient is placed in the lower and hotter part of the autoclave, filled with a specific amount of solvent. The autoclave is heated in order to create a temperature gradient. The nutrient dissolves in the hotter zone, and the hot saturated aqueous solution in the lower part is transported to the upper part by convective motion of the solution. The cooler, denser solution in the upper part of the autoclave descends, while the counterflowing more concentrated solution ascends. The solution becomes supersaturated in the upper part due to its lower temperature, and crystallization sets in.

=== Progressive cooling ===
In this technique, crystallization takes place without a temperature gradient between the growth and dissolution zones. Supersaturation is achieved by gradually reducing the solution temperature in the autoclave. The disadvantage of this technique is the difficulty in controlling the growth process and introducing seed crystals. For these reasons, this technique is very seldom used.

=== Metastable-phase technique ===
This technique is based on the difference in solubility between the phase to be grown and that serving as the starting material. The nutrient consists of compounds that are thermodynamically unstable under the growth conditions. The solubility of the metastable phase exceeds that of the stable phase, and the latter crystallize due to the dissolution of the metastable phase. This technique is usually combined with one of the other two techniques above.

=== Microwave-assisted technique ===
Compared to the classic techniques, at room temperature, this innovative one is expected to generate comparable morphostructural and biological properties of the obtained materials, but in a shorter time.

== Use beyond material science ==
=== Organic chemistry ===
Hydrothermal synthesis is of interest for green chemistry processes because it enables replacing fossil-based organic solvents with water alone. The hydrothermal condition can be seen as halfway between supercritical water and ordinary room-temperature water. The dielectric constant of water is reduced, allowing nonpolar substances to dissolve more readily. The self-dissociation constant of water also increases by three orders of magnitude, making OH^{−} and H^{+} more abundant for catalyzing reactions.

Processing biomass under hydrothermal conditions is already widely used in industry. It is the most common way for breaking down keratin molecules in feather meal into more digestible parts, though it comes with the downside of degrading some amino acids. It can break down biomass-rich waste products such as sewage sludge and waste straw into potentially useful materials.

== See also ==
- Chemical vapor deposition
- Czochralski method
- Flux method
- Verneuil method
