= Flux method =

Crystal growth method

Crystallization

Fundamentals
- Crystal; Crystal structure; Nucleation

Concepts
- Crystallization; Crystal growth; Recrystallization; Seed crystal; Protocrystalline; Single crystal

Methods and technology
- Boules; Bridgman–Stockbarger method; Van Arkel–de Boer process; Czochralski method; Epitaxy; Flux method; Fractional crystallization; Fractional freezing; Hydrothermal synthesis; Kyropoulos method; Laser-heated pedestal growth; Lely method; Micro-pulling-down; Shaping processes in crystal growth; Skull crucible; Verneuil method; Zone melting

The flux method is a crystal growth method where starting materials are dissolved in a solvent (flux), and are precipitated out to form crystals of a desired compound. The flux lowers the melting point of the desired compound, analogous to a wet chemistry recrystallization. The flux is molten in a highly stable crucible that does not react with the flux. Metal crucibles, such as platinum, titanium, and niobium are used for the growth of oxide crystals. Ceramic crucibles, such as alumina, zirconia, and boron nitride are used for the growth of metallic crystals. For air-sensitive growths, contents are sealed in ampoules or placed in atmosphere controlled furnaces.

== Choice of flux ==
Oxide fluxes are often combined to reduce volatility, viscosity, and reactivity towards the crucibles. Metallic fluxes aren't typically combined, as they do not suffer from the same volatility, viscosity, and reactivity issues. An ideal flux should have the following properties:

- Good solubility for desired compound at growth temperatures.
- Low melting point.
- Large gap between melting and boiling point.
- Easily removed from crystals.
- Unreactive with crucible and starting materials at growth temperatures.

Common Fluxes
Metallic Flux			Oxide Flux		
Flux	Melting Point (°C)	Boiling Point (°C)	Flux	Melting Point (°C)	Boiling Point (°C)
Aluminum	660	2470	Lead(II) Oxide	888	1477
Bismuth	271	1564	Lead(II) Fluoride	824	1293
Gallium	30	2400	Bismuth (III) Oxide	817	1890
Indium	157	2072	Lithium Oxide	1438	2600
Tin	232	2602	Molybdenum Trioxide	802	1152
Lead	328	1749	Potassium Fluoride	858	1502

== Furnace procedure ==
The growth (starting materials, flux, and crucible) are heated to form a complete liquid solution. The growth is cooled to a temperature where the solution is fully saturated. Further cooling causes crystals to precipitate from the solution, lowering the concentration of starting materials in solution, and lowering the temperature where the solution is fully saturated. The process is repeated, decreasing temperature and precipitating more crystals. The process is then stopped at a desired temperature, and the growth is removed from the furnace. Practically, the flux method is done by placing the growth into a programmable furnace:

1. Ramp - The furnace is heated from an initial temperature to a maximum temperature, where the growth forms a complete liquid solution.
2. Dwell - The furnace is maintained at the maximum temperature to homogenize the solution.
3. Cool - The furnace is cooled to a desired temperature over a specified rate or time.
4. Removal - The growth is removed from the furnace. The growth can be quenched, centrifuged, or simply removed if already at room temperature.

Additional steps may be added to this basic temperature profile, such as additional dwells or different cooling rates over different points of the cool. Crystallization can occur through spontaneous nucleation, encouragement with a seed, or through mechanical stress.

== Flux separation ==
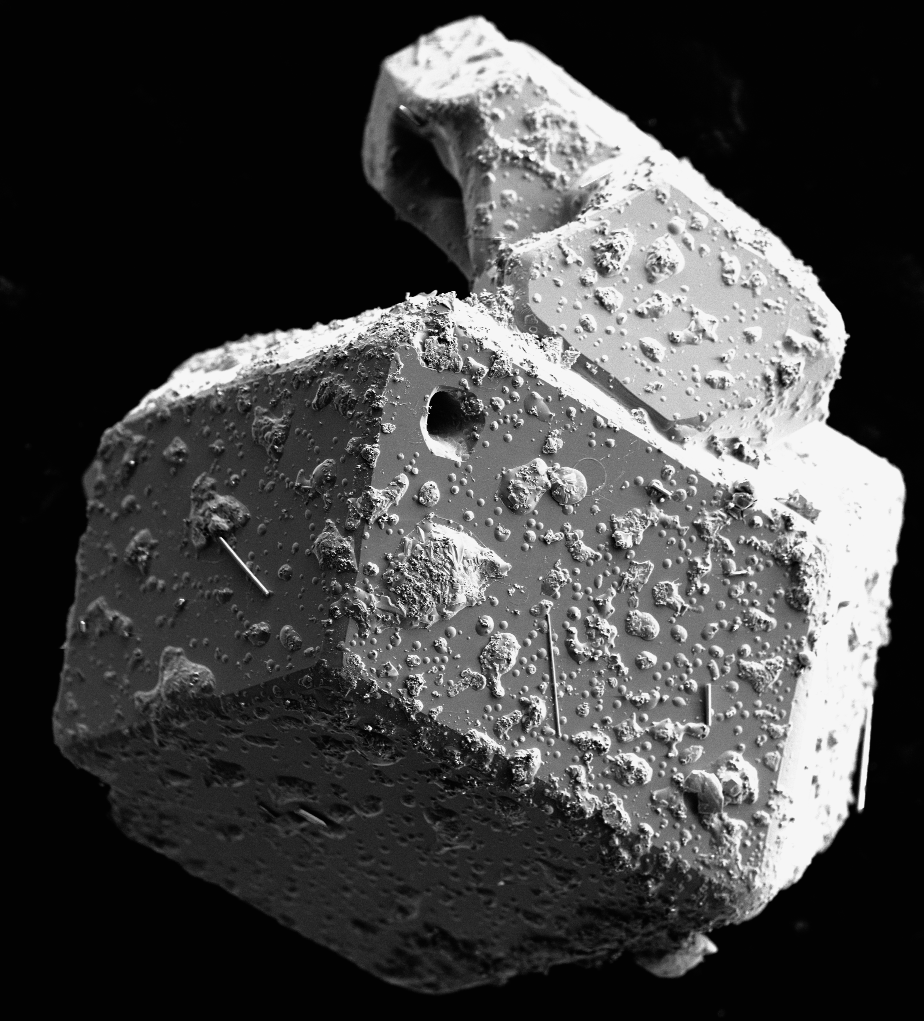
A crystal grown from gallium flux, with flux attached to the surface

After crystallization, often some solidified flux remains on the surface or inside the desired crystal. This flux may cause defects in the crystal due to the different thermal expansivities of the flux and crystal. A solvent (typically an acid or a base) can dissolve the flux, but it's difficult to find a solvent that doesn't also dissolve the crystal. The flux can be removed mechanically using a blade or drill. If the crystal and flux have significantly different boiling points, the flux may be removed with evaporation. Flux can also be removed through recrystallization through use of a seed in the liquid phase, leaving the flux behind as the crystals accumulate.

The removal of excess flux is important to assess a crystals properties, as the flux can affect measurements. For example, tin and lead super conduct at low temperatures, if a sample has tin or lead flux superconductivity can be observed even if the desired crystal is not a superconductor.

== See also ==
- Chemical vapor deposition
- Crystal growth
- Crystallography
- Czochralski process
- Epitaxy
- Hydrothermal synthesis
- Micro-pulling-down
- Verneuil process
