= Laser-heated pedestal growth =

Crystal growth technique

Crystallization

Fundamentals
- Crystal; Crystal structure; Nucleation

Concepts
- Crystallization; Crystal growth; Recrystallization; Seed crystal; Protocrystalline; Single crystal

Methods and technology
- Boules; Bridgman–Stockbarger method; Van Arkel–de Boer process; Czochralski method; Epitaxy; Flux method; Fractional crystallization; Fractional freezing; Hydrothermal synthesis; Kyropoulos method; Laser-heated pedestal growth; Lely method; Micro-pulling-down; Shaping processes in crystal growth; Skull crucible; Verneuil method; Zone melting

Laser-heated pedestal growth (LHPG) or laser floating zone (LFZ) is a crystal growth technique. A narrow region of a crystal is melted with a powerful CO_{2} or Nd:YAG laser. The laser and hence the floating zone, is moved along the crystal. The molten region melts impure solid at its forward edge and leaves a wake of purer material solidified behind it. This technique for growing crystals from the melt (liquid/solid phase transition) is used in materials research.

== Advantages ==
The main advantages of this technique are the high pulling rates (60 times greater than the conventional Czochralski technique) and the possibility of growing materials with very high melting points. In addition, LHPG is a crucible-free technique, which allows single crystals to be grown with high purity and low stress.

The geometric shape of the crystals (the technique can produce small diameters), and the low production cost, make the single-crystal fibers (SCF) produced by LHPG suitable substitutes for bulk crystals in many devices, especially those that use high-melting-point materials. However, single-crystal fibers must have equal or superior optical and structural qualities compared to bulk crystals to substitute for them in technological devices. This can be achieved by carefully controlling the growth conditions.

== Optical elements ==
Schematic of a LFZ system

Until 1980, laser-heated crystal growth used only two laser beams focused over the source material. This condition generated a high radial thermal gradient in the molten zone, making the process unstable. Increasing the number of beams to four did not solve the problem, although it improved the growth process.

An improvement to the laser-heated crystal growth technique was made by Fejer et al., who incorporated a special optical component known as a reflaxicon, consisting of an inner cone surrounded by a larger coaxial cone section, both with reflecting surfaces. This optical element converts the cylindrical laser beam into a larger diameter hollow cylinder surface. This optical component allows radial distribution of the laser energy over the molten zone, reducing radial thermal gradients. The axial temperature gradient in this technique can go as high as 10000 °C/cm, which is very high when compared to traditional crystal growth techniques (10–100 °C/cm).

== Convection speed ==
A feature of the LHPG technique is its high convection speed in the liquid phase due to Marangoni convection. It is possible to see that it spins very fast. Even when it appears to be standing still, it is in fact spinning fast on its axis.

== See also ==
- Crystal structure
- Crystallite
- Crystallization and engineering aspects
- Fractional crystallization
- Micro-pulling-down
- Nucleation
- Protocrystalline
- Recrystallization (metallurgy)
- Seed crystal
