= Verneuil method =

Manufacturing process of synthetic gemstones

Crystallization

Fundamentals
- Crystal; Crystal structure; Nucleation

Concepts
- Crystallization; Crystal growth; Recrystallization; Seed crystal; Protocrystalline; Single crystal

Methods and technology
- Boules; Bridgman–Stockbarger method; Van Arkel–de Boer process; Czochralski method; Epitaxy; Flux method; Fractional crystallization; Fractional freezing; Hydrothermal synthesis; Kyropoulos method; Laser-heated pedestal growth; Lely method; Micro-pulling-down; Shaping processes in crystal growth; Skull crucible; Verneuil method; Zone melting

The Verneuil method (or Verneuil process or Verneuil technique), also called flame fusion, was the first commercially successful method of manufacturing synthetic gemstones, developed in late 1883 by the French chemist Auguste Verneuil. It is primarily used to produce the ruby, sapphire and padparadscha varieties of corundum, as well as the diamond simulants rutile, strontium titanate and spinel. The principle of the process involves melting a finely powdered substance using an oxyhydrogen flame, and crystallising the melted droplets into a boule. The process is considered to be the founding step of modern industrial crystal growth technology, and remains in wide use to this day.

== History ==
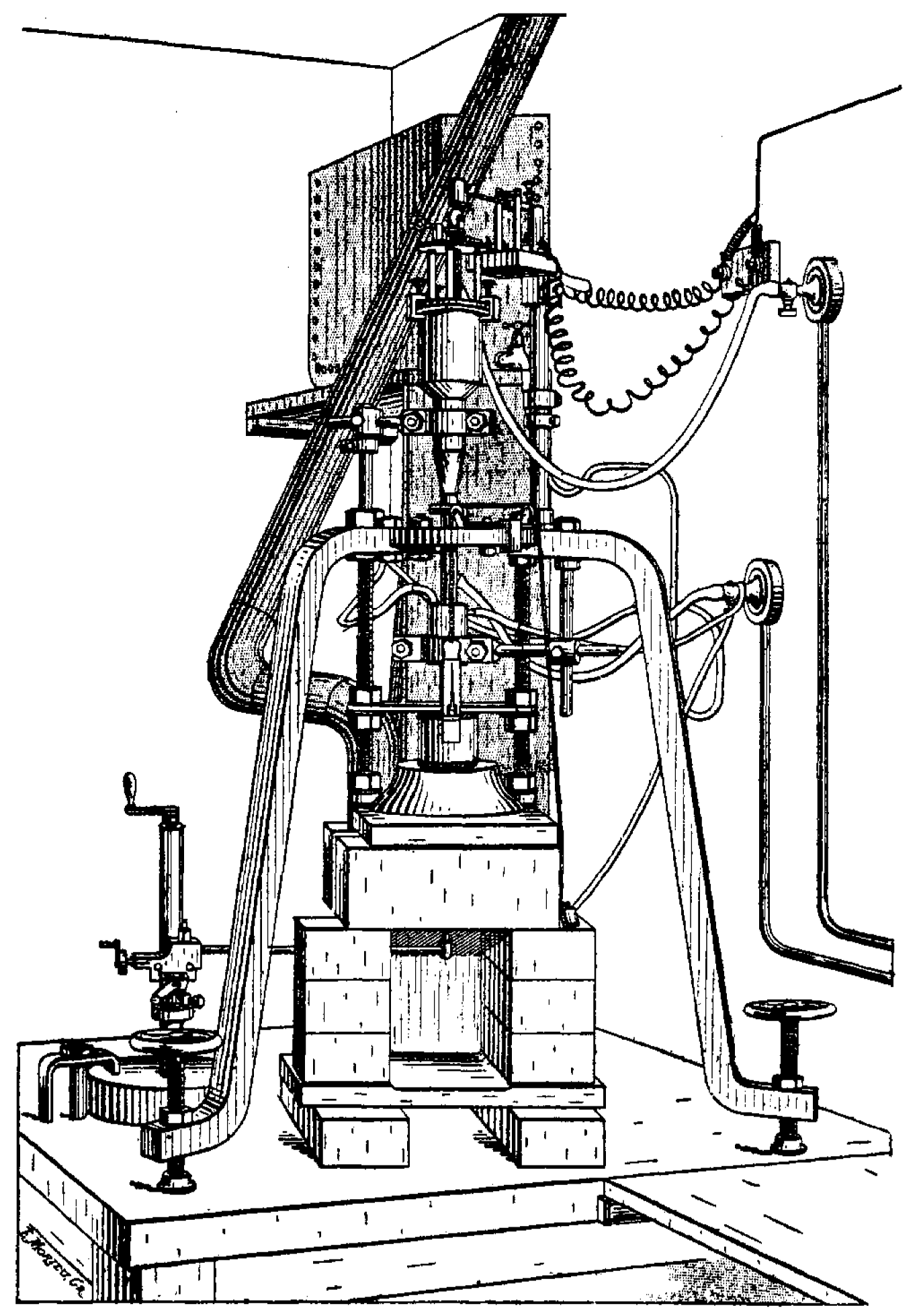
A sketch of an early furnace used by Verneuil to synthesise rubies using the Verneuil process.

Since the study of alchemy began, there have been attempts to synthetically produce precious stones, and ruby, being one of the prized cardinal gems, has long been a prime candidate. In the 19th century, significant advances were achieved, with the first ruby formed by melting two smaller rubies together in 1817, and the first microscopic crystals created from alumina (aluminium oxide) in a laboratory in 1837. By 1877, chemist Edmond Frémy had devised an effective method for commercial ruby manufacture by using molten baths of alumina, yielding the first gemstone-quality synthetic stones. The Parisian chemist Auguste Verneuil, who applied to work with Frémy at age 17, became Frémy's assistant in 1876 and helped develop the method, but soon went on to independently develop the flame fusion process, which would eventually come to bear his name.

One of Verneuil's sources of inspiration for developing his own method was the appearance of synthetic rubies sold by an unknown Genevan merchant in 1885. These "Geneva rubies" were determined to be artificial at the time but are now believed to be the first rubies produced by flame fusion, predating Verneuil's work by several years. After being introduced to the "Geneva rubies" by a mineralogist at the Natural Museum of History in Paris, Verneuil came to the conclusion that it was possible to recrystallise finely ground aluminium oxide into a large gemstone. This realisation, along with the availability of the recently developed oxyhydrogen torch and growing demand for synthetic rubies, led him to design the Verneuil furnace, where finely ground purified alumina and chromium oxide were melted by a flame of at least 2,000 °C (3,630 °F), and recrystallised on a support below the flame, creating a large crystal. Verneuil documented his work in sealed documents during the 1890s and publicly announced his work in 1902, publishing details outlining the process in 1904.

By 1910, Verneuil's laboratory had expanded into a 30-furnace production facility, with annual gemstone production by the Verneuil process having reached 1,000 kg (2,200 lb) in 1907. By 1912, production reached 3,200 kg (7,100 lb), and would go on to reach 200,000 kg (440,000 lb) in 1980 and 250,000 kg (550,000 lb) in 2000, led by Hrand Djevahirdjian's factory in Monthey, Switzerland, founded in 1914. The most notable improvements in the process were made in 1932, by S. K. Popov, who helped establish the capability for producing high-quality sapphires in the Soviet Union through the next 20 years. A large production capability was also established in the United States during World War II, when European sources were not available, and jewels were in high demand for their military applications such as for timepieces.

The process was designed primarily for the synthesis of rubies, which became the first gemstone to be produced on an industrial scale. However, the Verneuil process could also be used for the production of other stones, including blue sapphire which required oxides of iron and titanium to be used in place of chromium oxide. The basic process can be used to form even more elaborate gemstones such as star sapphires, where titania (titanium dioxide) was added and the boule was kept in the heat longer, allowing needles of rutile to crystallise within it. In 1947, the Linde Air Products division of Union Carbide pioneered the use of the Verneuil process for creating such star sapphires, until production was discontinued in 1974 owing to overseas competition.

Despite some improvements in the method, the Verneuil process remains virtually unchanged to this day, while maintaining a leading position in the manufacture of synthetic corundum and spinel gemstones. Its most significant setback came in 1917, when Jan Czochralski introduced the Czochralski process, which has found numerous applications in the semiconductor industry, where a much higher quality of crystals is required than the Verneuil process can produce. Other alternatives to the process emerged in 1957, when Bell Labs introduced the hydrothermal process, and in 1958, when Carroll Chatham introduced the flux method. In 1989 Larry P Kelley of ICT, Inc. also developed a variant of the Czochralski process where natural ruby is used as the 'feed' material.

== Process ==
A simplified diagram of the Verneuil process

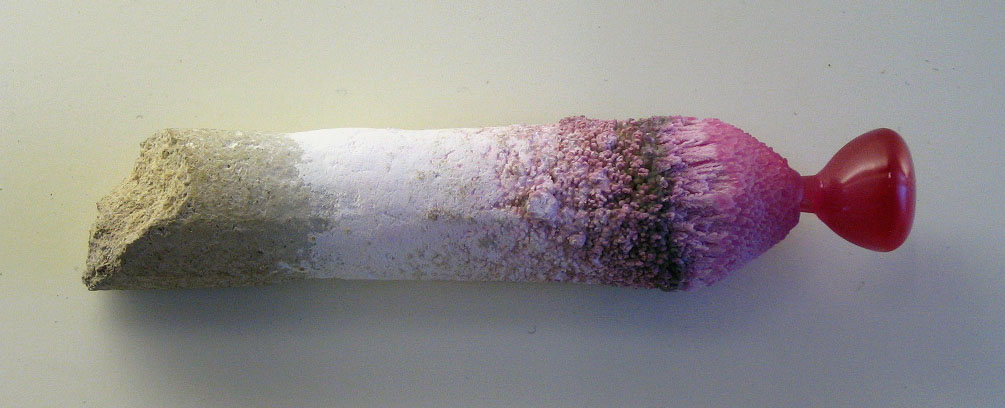
A small ruby boule, still attached to the rod, produced by the Verneuil process

One of the most crucial factors in successfully crystallising an artificial gemstone is obtaining highly pure starting material, with at least 99.9995% purity. In the case of manufacturing rubies, sapphires or padparadscha, this material is alumina. The presence of sodium impurities is especially undesirable, as it makes the crystal opaque. But because the bauxite from which alumina is obtained is most likely by way of the Bayer process (the first stage of which introduces caustic soda in order to separate the Al_{2}O_{3}) particular attention must be paid to the feedstock.

Depending on the desired colouration of the crystal, small quantities of various oxides are added, such as chromium oxide for a red ruby, or ferric oxide and titania for a blue sapphire. Other starting materials include titania for producing rutile, or titanyl double oxalate for producing strontium titanate. Alternatively, small, valueless crystals of the desired product can be used.

This starting material is finely powdered, and placed in a container within a Verneuil furnace, with an opening at the bottom through which the powder can escape when the container is vibrated. While the powder is being released, oxygen is supplied into the furnace, and travels with the powder down a narrow tube. This tube is located within a larger tube, into which hydrogen is supplied. At the point where the narrow tube opens into the larger one, combustion occurs, with a flame of at least 2,000 °C (3,630 °F) at its core. As the powder passes through the flame, it melts into small droplets, which fall onto an earthen support rod placed below. The droplets gradually form a sinter cone on the rod, the tip of which is close enough to the core to remain liquid. It is at that tip that the seed crystal eventually forms. As more droplets fall onto the tip, a single crystal, called a boule, starts to form, and the support is slowly moved downward, allowing the base of the boule to crystallise, while its cap always remains liquid. The boule is formed in the shape of a tapered cylinder, with a diameter broadening away from the base and eventually remaining more or less constant. With a constant supply of powder and withdrawal of the support, very long cylindrical boules can be obtained. Once removed from the furnace and allowed to cool, the boule is split along its vertical axis to relieve internal pressure, otherwise the crystal will be prone to fracture when the stalk is broken due to a vertical parting plane.

When initially outlining the process, Verneuil specified a number of conditions crucial for good results. These include: a flame temperature that is not higher than necessary for fusion; always keeping the melted product in the same part of the oxyhydrogen flame; and reducing the point of contact between the melted product and support to as small an area as possible. The average commercially produced boule using the process is 13 mm (0.51 in) in diameter and 25 to 50 mm (0.98 to 1.97 in) long, weighing about 125 carats (25.0 g). The process can also be performed with a custom-oriented seed crystal to achieve a specific desired crystallographic orientation.

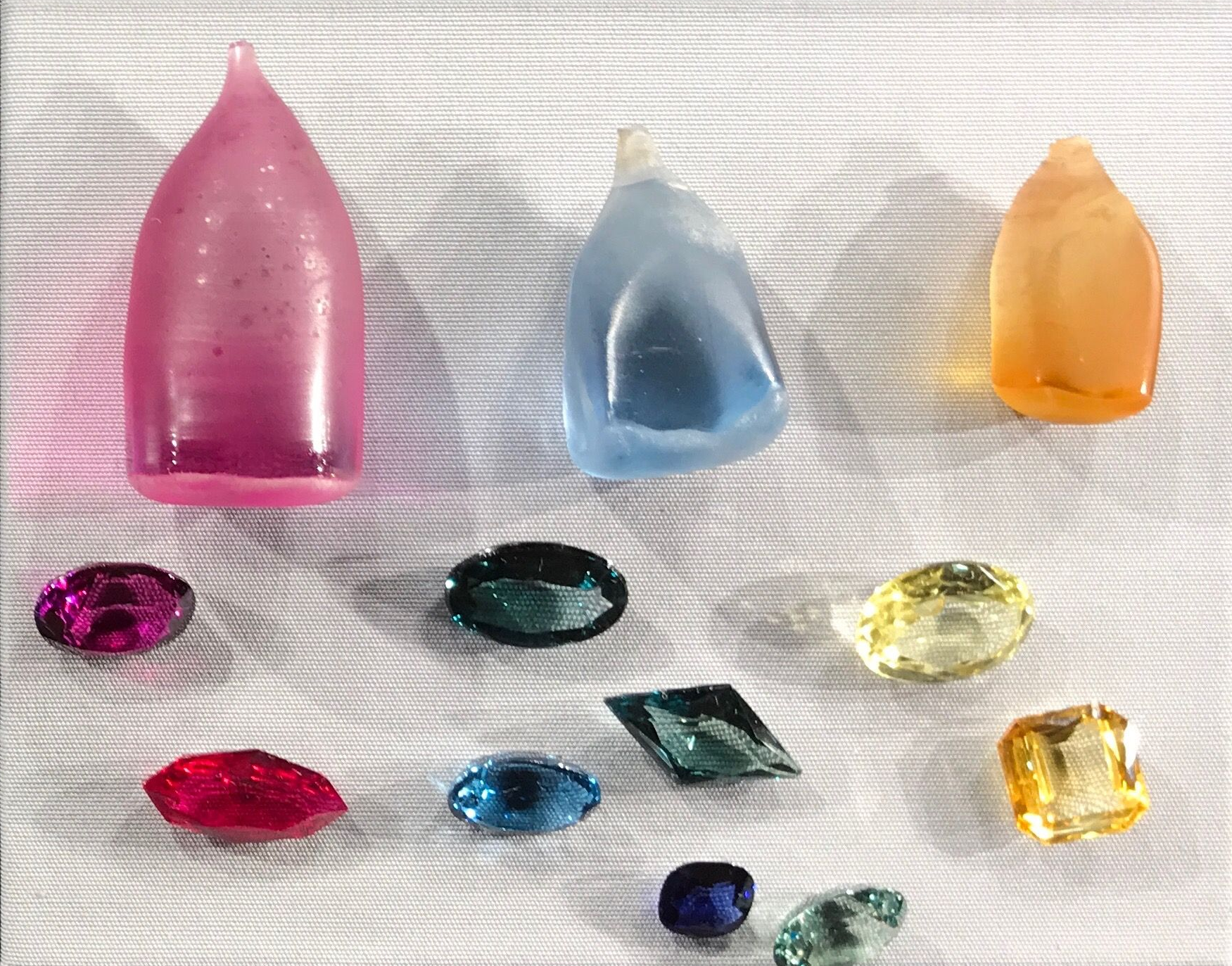
Synthetic Corundum

Crystals produced by the Verneuil process are chemically and physically equivalent to their naturally occurring counterparts, and strong magnification is usually required to distinguish between the two. A telltale characteristic is the Verneuil crystal is curved growth lines (curved striae) form, as the cylindrical boule grows upwards in an environment with a high thermal gradient, while the equivalent lines in natural crystals are straight. Another distinguishing feature is the common presence of microscopic gas bubbles formed due to an excess of oxygen in the furnace; imperfections in natural crystals are usually solid impurities.

== See also ==
- Bridgman–Stockbarger method
- Czochralski method
- Float-zone silicon
- Kyropoulos method
- Laser-heated pedestal growth
- Micro-pulling-down
- Shelby Gem Factory
