= Bridgman–Stockbarger method =

Method of crystallization

Crystallization

Fundamentals
- Crystal; Crystal structure; Nucleation

Concepts
- Crystallization; Crystal growth; Recrystallization; Seed crystal; Protocrystalline; Single crystal

Methods and technology
- Boules; Bridgman–Stockbarger method; Van Arkel–de Boer process; Czochralski method; Epitaxy; Flux method; Fractional crystallization; Fractional freezing; Hydrothermal synthesis; Kyropoulos method; Laser-heated pedestal growth; Lely method; Micro-pulling-down; Shaping processes in crystal growth; Skull crucible; Verneuil method; Zone melting

The Bridgman–Stockbarger method, or Bridgman–Stockbarger technique, is named after physicists Percy Williams Bridgman (1882–1961) and Donald C. Stockbarger (1895–1952). The method includes two similar but distinct techniques primarily used for growing boules (single-crystal ingots), but which can be used for solidifying polycrystalline ingots as well.

== Overview ==
The methods involve heating polycrystalline material above its melting point and slowly cooling it from one end of its container, where a seed crystal is located. A single crystal of the same crystallographic orientation as the seed material is grown on the seed and is progressively formed along the length of the container. The process can be carried out in a horizontal or vertical orientation, and usually involves a rotating crucible/ampoule to stir the melt. The horizontal configuration can avoid placing stresses on the crystal due to thermal expansion and can purify the crystal at the cost of evaporation but the shape of the liquid-solid interface between the molten material and the crystal is more concave. Compared to the temperature gradient method where a temperature gradient is required along the entire length of the crucible, in vertical Bridgman method allows for a small temperature gradient only near the liquid-solid interface.

The Bridgman method is a popular way of producing certain semiconductor crystals such as gallium arsenide, for which the Czochralski method is more difficult. The process can reliably produce single-crystal ingots, but does not necessarily result in uniform properties through the crystal.

Diagram of the Bridgman-Stockbarger method

The difference between the Bridgman technique and Stockbarger technique is subtle: While both methods utilize a temperature gradient and a moving crucible, the Bridgman technique utilizes the relatively uncontrolled gradient produced at the exit of the furnace; the Stockbarger technique introduces a baffle, or shelf, separating two coupled furnaces with temperatures above and below the freezing point. Stockbarger's modification of the Bridgman technique allows for better control over the temperature gradient at the melt/crystal interface.

When seed crystals are not employed as described above, polycrystalline ingots can be produced from a feedstock consisting of rods, chunks, or any irregularly shaped pieces once they are melted and allowed to re-solidify. The resultant microstructure of the ingots so obtained are characteristic of directionally solidified metals and alloys with their aligned grains.

=== Bagdasarov method ===
A variant of the technique known as the horizontal directional solidification method (HDSM) developed by Khachik Bagdasarov (Russian: Хачик Багдасаров) starting in the 1960s in the Soviet Union. It uses a flat-bottomed crucible made out of molybdenum with short sidewalls rather than an enclosed ampoule, and has been used to grow various large oxide crystals including Yb:YAG (a laser host crystal), and sapphire crystals 45 cm wide and over 1 meter long. However, the quality of the crystals grown by HDSM differ from the Czochralski method, due to the problem of the problematic presence of bubbles.

== See also ==
- Float-zone silicon
