= Kyropoulos method =

Method of bulk crystal growth used to obtain single crystals

Crystallization

Fundamentals
- Crystal; Crystal structure; Nucleation

Concepts
- Crystallization; Crystal growth; Recrystallization; Seed crystal; Protocrystalline; Single crystal

Methods and technology
- Boules; Bridgman–Stockbarger method; Van Arkel–de Boer process; Czochralski method; Epitaxy; Flux method; Fractional crystallization; Fractional freezing; Hydrothermal synthesis; Kyropoulos method; Laser-heated pedestal growth; Micro-pulling-down; Shaping processes in crystal growth; Skull crucible; Verneuil method; Zone melting

The Kyropoulos method, also known as the KY method or Kyropoulos technique, is a method of bulk crystal growth used to obtain single crystals.

The largest application of the Kyropoulos method is to grow large boules of single crystal sapphire used to produce substrates for the manufacture gallium nitride-based LEDs, and as a durable optical material.

== History ==
The method is named for Spyro Kyropoulos, who proposed the technique in 1926 as a method to grow brittle alkali halide and alkali earth metal crystals for precision optics. The method was a response to the limited boule sizes attainable by the Czochralski and Verneuil methods at the time.

The Kyropoulos method was applied to sapphire crystal growth in the 1970s in the Soviet Union.

== The method ==
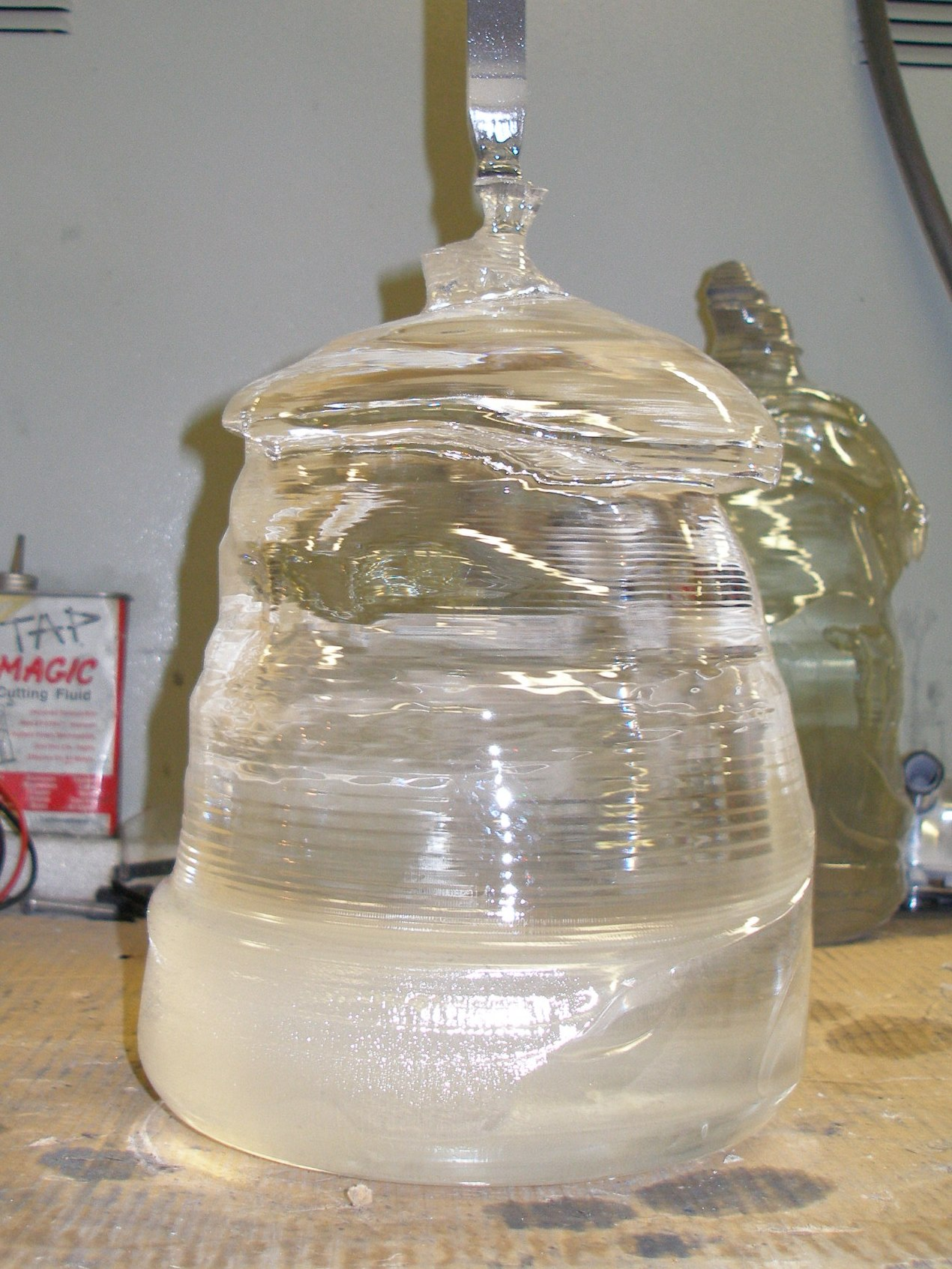
Single crystal sapphire boule grown by Kyropoulos method. Approximately 200 mm diameter and approximately 30 kg. (A second boule is visible in the background.)

The feedstock is melted in a crucible. (For sapphire crystal growth, the feedstock is high-purity aluminum oxide—only a few parts per million of impurities—which is then heated above 2100 °C in a tungsten or molybdenum crucible.) A precisely oriented seed crystal is dipped into the molten material. The seed crystal is slowly pulled upwards and may be rotated simultaneously. By precisely controlling the temperature gradients, rate of pulling and rate of temperature decrease, it is possible to produce a large, single-crystal, roughly cylindrical ingot from the melt.

In contrast with the Czochralski method, the Kyropoulos technique crystallizes the entire feedstock volume into the boule. The size and aspect ratio of the crucible is close to that of the final crystal, and the crystal grows downward into the crucible, rather than being pulled up and out of the crucible as in the Czochralski method. The upward pulling of the seed is at a much slower rate than the downward growth of the crystal, and serves primarily to shape the meniscus of the solid-liquid interface via surface tension.

The growth rate is controlled by slowly decreasing the temperature of the furnace until the entire melt has solidified. Hanging the seed from a weight sensor can provide feedback to determine the growth rate, although precise measurements are complicated by the changing and imperfect shape of the crystal diameter, the unknown convex shape of the solid-liquid interface, and these features' interaction with buoyant forces and convection within the melt.

The Kyropoulos method is characterized by smaller temperature gradients at the crystallization front than the Czochralski method. Like the Czochralski method, the crystal grows free of any external mechanical shaping forces, and thus has few lattice defects and low internal stress. This process can be performed in an inert atmosphere, such as argon, or under high vacuum.

=== Advantages ===
The major advantages include technical simplicity of the process and possibility to grow crystals with large sizes (≥30 cm). The method also shows low dislocation density.

=== Disadvantages ===
The most significant disadvantage of the method is an unstable speed of growth which happens due to heat exchange changes incurred by a growing boule size and which are difficult to predict. Due to this problem the crystals are typically grown at very slow speed in order to avoid unnecessary internal defects.

== Application ==
Currently the method is used by several companies around the world to produce sapphire for the electronics and optics industries.

=== Crystal sizes ===
The sizes of sapphire crystals grown by the Kyropoulos method have increased dramatically since the 1980s. In the mid-2000s sapphire crystals up to 30 kg were developed which could yield 150 mm diameter substrates. By 2017, the largest reported sapphire grown by the Kyropoulos method was 350 kg, and could produce 300 mm diameter substrates.

Because of sapphire's anisotropic crystal structure, the orientation of the cylindrical axis of the boules grown by the Kyropoulos method is perpendicular to the orientation required for deposition of GaN on the LED substrates. This means that cores must be drilled through the sides of the boule before being sliced into wafers. This means the as-grown boules have a significantly larger diameter than the resulting wafers.

As of 2017 the leading manufacturers of blue and white LEDs used 150 mm diameter sapphire substrates, with some manufacturers still using 100 mm, and 2 inch substrates.

== See also ==
- Bridgman–Stockbarger method
- Monocrystalline silicon
- Float-zone silicon
- Laser-heated pedestal growth
- Micro-pulling-down
