= Micro-pulling-down =

Crystal growth technique

Crystallization

Fundamentals
- Crystal; Crystal structure; Nucleation

Concepts
- Crystallization; Crystal growth; Recrystallization; Seed crystal; Protocrystalline; Single crystal

Methods and technology
- Boules; Bridgman–Stockbarger method; Van Arkel–de Boer process; Czochralski method; Epitaxy; Flux method; Fractional crystallization; Fractional freezing; Hydrothermal synthesis; Kyropoulos method; Laser-heated pedestal growth; Micro-pulling-down; Shaping processes in crystal growth; Skull crucible; Verneuil method; Zone melting

The micro-pulling-down (μ-PD) method is a crystal growth technique based on continuous transport of the melted substance through micro-channel(s) made in a crucible bottom. Continuous solidification of the melt is progressed on a liquid/solid interface positioned under the crucible. In a steady state, both the melt and the crystal are pulled-down with a constant (but generally different) velocity.

Many different types of crystal are grown by this technique, including Y_{3}Al_{5}O_{12}, Si, Si-Ge, LiNbO_{3}, α-Al_{2}O_{3}, Y_{2}O_{3}, Sc_{2}O_{3}, LiF, CaF_{2}, BaF_{2}, etc.

== Crystal growth routine ==
Standard routine procedure used in the growth of most of μ-PD crystals is well developed. The general stages of the growths include:

- Charging of the crucible with starting materials (mixture of powders)
- Heating of the crucible until starting materials in the crucible are completely melted
- Upward displacement of the seed until its contact with the meniscus or crucible
- Formation of the meniscus and partial melting of the seed top
- Correction of the shape of the meniscus through appropriate adjustment of crucible temperature and position of the seed crystal
- Crystal growth through pulling of the seed in downward direction
- Separation of the as grown crystal from the meniscus
- Cooling of the system (including the crystal and the crucible) to room temperature

== See also ==
- Crystal growth
- Czochralski process
- Float-zone silicon
- Flux method
- Laser-heated pedestal growth
- Shaping processes in crystal growth
- Verneuil process
- Lithium niobate
- Sapphire
- Scandium(III) oxide
- Yttrium aluminium garnet
