= Boule (crystal) =

Synthetic ingot of crystal

Crystallization

Fundamentals
- Crystal; Crystal structure; Nucleation

Concepts
- Crystallization; Crystal growth; Recrystallization; Seed crystal; Protocrystalline; Single crystal

Methods and technology
- Boules; Bridgman–Stockbarger method; Van Arkel–de Boer process; Czochralski method; Epitaxy; Flux method; Fractional crystallization; Fractional freezing; Hydrothermal synthesis; Kyropoulos method; Laser-heated pedestal growth; Lely method; Micro-pulling-down; Shaping processes in crystal growth; Skull crucible; Verneuil method; Zone melting

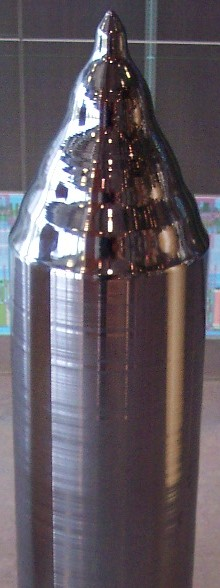
Monocrystalline silicon boule

A boule is a single-crystal ingot produced by synthetic means.

A boule of silicon is the starting material for most of the integrated circuits used today. In the semiconductor industry synthetic boules can be made by a number of methods, such as the Bridgman technique and the Czochralski process, which result in a cylindrical rod of material.

In the Czochralski process a seed crystal is required to create a larger crystal, or ingot. This seed crystal is dipped into the pure molten silicon and slowly extracted. The molten silicon grows on the seed crystal in a crystalline fashion. As the seed is extracted the silicon solidifies and eventually a large, cylindrical boule is produced.

A semiconductor crystal boule is normally cut into circular wafers using an inside hole diamond saw or diamond wire saw, and each wafer is lapped and polished to provide substrates suitable for the fabrication of semiconductor devices on its surface.

The process is also used to create sapphires, which are used for substrates in the production of blue and white LEDs, optical windows in special applications and as the protective covers for watches.

A popular method used to create sapphire boules is the heat exchanger method, in which aluminium oxide is placed in a molybdenum crucible and heated until melting at 2200°C. It allows for very large crystals over 30 cm wide to be produced. The process takes place in a vacuum. A sapphire seed crystal sits at the bottom of the crucible and is kept from melting by heat exchange (cooling) with helium gas or liquid helium in which is shielded from the vacuum by a cold finger heat exchanger. The furnace is kept at a temperature just above melting, but the heat exchanger is at a temperature just below melting. Then the heat exchanger temperature is lowered to start crystalization, and then the aluminium oxide is cooled over a period of at least 72 hours to 17 days to crystalize it into sapphire. The crucibles are single-use, the process is similar to the Bridgman technique and the Stöber methods for crystal growth, and was used for iPhone screens. The crystal grows upward from the bottom of the crucible.

Another method is the edge-defined film-fed growth method, very similar to the Czochralski method but the material passes through a die before cooling, which shapes the crystal. The crystal does not rotate. Chemical vapor deposition, gradient furnace or vertical bridgman processes can be used for sapphire crystal growth.

The temperature gradient method uses a furnace in which a crucible containing material is located. On the bottom of the crucible, a seed crystal is placed. The material is melted and then kept molten for hours until the temperature stabilizes. The furnace is operated in a vacuum and when the temperature reaches 1400°c at the bottom of the crucible, argon gas is injected. Crystallization then starts by cooling the molten material at 1.3 to 3 kelvin per hour, with a linear temperature gradient across the height of the furnace making the material crystallize from the bottom up. The gradient is produced by cooling parts of the furnace with water. The temperature gradient can also be created by having several heaters along the height of the furnace, dividing the heaters into temperature zones and changing the temperature of the zones.

Large crystals 50cm across, of water soluble material such as monopotassium phosphate (KH_{2}PO_{4}) can be made by dissolving the KH_{2}PO_{4} in hot water and salt, creating a growth solution, placing a seed crystal in the solution and then cooling the solution, done in a holden-type crystallizer, in what is known as solution growth.
