= Shaping processes in crystal growth =

Crystallization

Fundamentals
- Crystal; Crystal structure; Nucleation

Concepts
- Crystallization; Crystal growth; Recrystallization; Seed crystal; Protocrystalline; Single crystal

Methods and technology
- Boules; Bridgman–Stockbarger method; Van Arkel–de Boer process; Czochralski method; Epitaxy; Flux method; Fractional crystallization; Fractional freezing; Hydrothermal synthesis; Kyropoulos method; Laser-heated pedestal growth; Micro-pulling-down; Shaping processes in crystal growth; Skull crucible; Verneuil method; Zone melting

Shaping processes in crystal growth are a collection of techniques for growing bulk crystals of a defined shape from a melt, usually by constraining the shape of the liquid meniscus by means of a mechanical shaper. Crystals are commonly grown as fibers, solid cylinders, hollow cylinders (or tubes), and sheets (or plates). More complex shapes such as tubes with a complex cross section, and domes have also been produced. Using a shaping process can produce a near net shape crystal and reduce the manufacturing cost for crystals which are composed of very expensive or difficult to machine materials.

== List of shaping processes ==
- Horizontal Ribbon Growth (HRG, 1959)
- Edge-defined Film-fed Growth (EFG, 1960)
- Low Angle Silicon Sheet (LASS, 1981)
- Micro-pulling-down (μ-PD)
- Stepanov technique
- String ribbon

== Edge-defined film-fed growth ==
Edge-defined film-fed growth or EFG was developed for sapphire growth in the late 1960s by Harold LaBelle and A. Mlavsky at Tyco Industries. A shaper (also referred to as a die) having dimensions approximately equal to the crystal to be grown rests above the surface of the melt which is contained in a crucible. Capillary action feeds liquid material to a slit at the center of the shaper. When a seed crystal is touched to the liquid film and raised upwards, a single crystal forms at the interface between the solid seed and the liquid film. By continuing to pull the seed upwards, the crystal expands as a liquid film forms between the crystal and the top surface of the shaper. When the film reaches the edges of the shaper, the final crystal shape matches that of the shaper.

The exact dimensions of the crystal will deviate from the dimensions of the shaper because every material has a characteristic growth angle, the angle formed at the triple interface between the solid crystal, liquid film, and the atmosphere. Because of the growth angle, varying the height of the meniscus (i.e. the thickness of the liquid film) will change the dimensions of the crystal. The meniscus height is affected by pulling speed and crystallization rate. The crystallization rate depends on the temperature gradient above the shaper, which is determined by the configuration of the hot-zone of the crystal growth furnace, and the power applied to the heating elements during growth. The difference in thermal expansion coefficients between the shaper material and the crystal material can also cause appreciable size differences between the shaper and the crystal at room temperature for crystals grown at high temperatures.

The shaper material should be non-reactive with both the melt and growth atmosphere, and should be wet by the melt.

It is possible to grow multiple crystals from a single crucible using the EFG technique, for example by growing many parallel sheets.

=== Applications ===
Sapphire: EFG is used to grow large plates of sapphire, primarily for use as robust infrared windows for defense and other applications. Windows about 7 mm thick x 300 mm wide x 500 mm long are produced. The shaper is typically made from molybdenum.

Silicon: EFG was used in the 2000s by Schott Solar to produce silicon sheets for solar photovoltaic panels, by pulling a thin-walled (~250-300 μm) octagon with faces 12.5 cm on a side and diameter about 38 cm, about 5–6 m long. The shaper is typically made from graphite.

Other oxides: Many high melting-point oxides have been grown by EFG, among them Ga_{2}O_{3}, LiNbO_{3}, and Nd^{3+}:(Lu_{x}Gd_{1−x})_{3}Ga_{5}O_{12} (Nd:LGGG). Often an iridium shaper is used.

== Horizontal ribbon growth ==
Horizontal ribbon growth or HRG is a method developed and patented by William Shockley in 1959 for silicon growth. By this method a thin crystalline sheet is pulled horizontally from the top of a crucible. The melt level must be constantly replenished in order to keep the surface of the melt at the same height as the edge of the crucible from which the sheet is being pulled. By blowing a cooling gas at the surface of the growing sheet, very high growth rates (>400 mm/min) can be achieved. The method relies on the solid crystal floating on the surface of the melt, which works because solid silicon is less dense than liquid silicon.

== Micro-pulling-down ==
The micro-pulling-down or μ-PD technique uses a small round opening in the bottom of the crucible to pull a crystalline fiber downward. Hundreds of different crystalline materials have been grown by this technique.

A variation called pendant drop growth or PDG uses a slot in the bottom of the crucible to produce crystalline sheets in a similar manner.

== Stepanov technique ==
The Stepanov technique was developed by A.V. Stepanov in the Soviet Union after 1950. The method involves pulling a crystal vertically through a shaper located at the surface of the melt. The shaper is not necessarily fed by a capillary channel as in EFG. The shaper material may be wetted or non-wetted by the melt, as opposed to EFG where the shaper material is wetted. The technique has been used to grow metal, semiconductor, and oxide crystals.

Czochralski growth using a floating shaper known as a "coracle" was done for some III-V semiconductors prior to the development of advanced control-systems for diameter control.

== String ribbon ==
The string ribbon method, also known as dendritic web or edge-supported pulling, has been used to grow semiconductor sheets including indium antimonide, gallium arsenide, germanium, and silicon. A seed crystal with the width and thickness matching the sheet to be grown is dipped into the top surface of the melt. Strings of a suitable material are fixed to the vertical edges of the seed and extend down through holes in the bottom of the crucible to a spool. As the seed is raised, string is continuously fed through the melt and a liquid film forms between the seed, the strings, and the melt. The film crystallizes to the seed, forming a sheet or ribbon.
