= Protocrystalline =

Crystallization

Fundamentals
- Crystal; Crystal structure; Nucleation

Concepts
- Crystallization; Crystal growth; Recrystallization; Seed crystal; Protocrystalline; Single crystal

Methods and technology
- Boules; Bridgman–Stockbarger method; Van Arkel–de Boer process; Czochralski method; Epitaxy; Flux method; Fractional crystallization; Fractional freezing; Hydrothermal synthesis; Kyropoulos method; Laser-heated pedestal growth; Micro-pulling-down; Shaping processes in crystal growth; Skull crucible; Verneuil method; Zone melting

A protocrystalline phase is a distinct phase occurring during crystal growth, which evolves into a microcrystalline form. The term is typically associated with silicon films in optical applications such as solar cells.

== Applications ==
=== Silicon solar cells ===
Amorphous silicon (a-Si) is a popular solar cell material owing to its low cost and ease of production. Owing to its disordered structure (Urbach tail), its absorption extends to the energies below the band gap, resulting in a wide-range spectral response; however, it has a relatively low solar cell efficiency. Protocrystalline Si (pc-Si:H) also has a relatively low absorption near the band gap, owing to its more ordered crystalline structure. Thus, protocrystalline and amorphous silicon can be combined in a tandem solar cell, where the top thin layer of a-Si:H absorbs short-wavelength light whereas the underlying protocrystalline silicon layer absorbs the longer wavelengths

== See also ==
- Amorphous silicon
- Crystallite
- Multijunction
- Polycarbonate (PC)
- Polyethylene terephthalate (PET)
