= William Dichtel =

American chemist

- Born: September 19, 1978 (age 48); Houston, Texas
- Education: Massachusetts Institute of Technology B.S. (2000); University of California Berkeley Ph.D. (2005)
- Awards: Beckman Young Investigators Award, MacArthur Fellow
- Scientific career
- Fields: Chemistry
- Workplaces: Northwestern University (2016-present) Cornell University (2008-2016); University of California Los Angeles (2005–2008) California Institute of Technology (2005–2008)
- Thesis: Design and synthesis of porphyrin containing macromolecules for light harvesting and catalysis (2005)
- Doctoral advisor: Jean Fréchet
- Other academic advisors: Sir Fraser Stoddart, Jim Heath, Tim Swager
- Website: sites.northwestern.edu/dichtel/

William Dichtel (born 1978, Houston, Texas) is an American chemist and the Robert L. Letsinger Professor of Chemistry at Northwestern University. He is known for pioneering work in an emerging class of polymers known as covalent organic frameworks (COFs), two-dimensional polymers, and porous materials for environmental remediation including novel methods for forever chemical (PFAS) destruction and recycling polyurethane foams. Dichtel's research has been recognized nationally and internationally, receiving the MacArthur Fellowship in 2015, a Guggenheim Fellowship in 2018, and the Blavatnik National Award in Chemistry in 2020. He also founded Cyclopure, a university spin-off that seeks to bring to market water filtration with cyclodextrin polymers.

Dichtel is an accomplished marathon open water swimmer. In August 2020, he completed the Chicago Sky Line Swim. He swam the Catalina Channel in July 2022, and the English Channel on June 25, 2024, in 12 hours, 8 minutes. On October 11, 2026, he completed the 20 Bridges Swim around Manhattan. These three swims comprise the Triple Crown of Open Water Swimming, which has been completed by approximately 400 individuals as of 2026.

== Early life and education ==
Dichtel was born in Houston, Texas, and raised in Roanoke, Virginia. He earned a B.S. in Chemistry from the Massachusetts Institute of Technology in 2000, where he worked with Prof. Timothy M. Swager. He completed his Ph.D. at the University of California, Berkeley in 2005 under Jean M. J. Fréchet, focusing on porphyrin-containing dendrimers for light harvesting applications. He then moved to Los Angeles to perform joint postdoctoral research between 2005 and 2008 with Prof. Fraser Stoddart at UCLA, and Prof. James R. Heath at Caltech, where he studied rotaxanes.

== Independent career ==
Dichtel began his independent career in the Department of Chemistry and Chemical Biology at Cornell University in 2008, and was promoted to associate professor in 2014. He moved to Northwestern University in 2016 as the Robert L. Letsinger Professor of Chemistry. At Northwestern, the Dichtel Research Group focuses on using organic synthesis and noncovalent assembly to control the structure and reactivity of molecules, materials, and interfaces across chemical environments; moreover, the group uses the tools of synthetic chemistry to better understand and design nanostructured materials.

== Research contributions ==
Dichtel’s research integrates synthetic and polymer chemistry to create porous materials and two-dimensional polymers with applications in separations, energy storage, and sustainability.

2D polymers and covalent organic frameworks: Dichtel’s research helped establish 2D-COFs as a new class of porous polymers, demonstrating redox-active frameworks, thin-film growth on graphene, and mechanistic control over crystallization. In 2025, his team reported the first mechanically interlocked two-dimensional polymer, formed by topochemical polymerization to yield layered sheets with enhanced mechanical properties.

Water purification: Dichtel developed cyclodextrin-based porous polymers that rapidly remove organic micropollutants and PFAS from water. These materials underpin commercial products containing DEXSORB® technology from Cyclopure, which he founded in 2016. He also led a 2022 study describing a simple, low-temperature method to degrade multiple PFAS classes using dimethyl sulfoxide and sodium hydroxide.

Recycling thermoset polyurethanes as covalent adaptable networks: Dichtel and his research group developed a new recycling method for polyurethane foams, one of the most common types of plastic, that uses nontoxic, greener catalysts. The process involves chemical reactions that simultaneously reprocess and “refoam” polyurethane after heating in the presence of a catalyst. The types of polymers that require this catalyst approach are called thermosets, or cross-linked polymers. Thermosets are important because of their superior durability and stability, but these properties come at the expense of recyclability. New methods to recycle thermosets will reduce greenhouse gas emissions, save energy and decrease landfill use.

== Awards and honors ==
- 2026 – ACS Green Chemistry Challenge Award
- 2026 – Mark Scholar Award, Division of Polymer Chemistry, Inc.
- 2021-2025 – Clarivate Highly Cited Researcher
- 2021 – ACS/PMSE Global Outstanding Student & Mentor Awards in Polymer Science & Engineering
- 2021 – Fellow, American Association for the Advancement of Science
- 2020 – National Laureate, Blavatnik Awards for Young Scientists in Chemistry
- 2018 – Akron Section Award, American Chemical Society
- 2018 – Frontiers in Research Excellence and Discovery (FRED) Award, Research Corporation
- 2018 – Guggenheim Fellowship
- 2017 – Crain’s Chicago Business 40 Under 40
- 2017 – Leo Hendrik Baekeland Award, North Jersey Section of the American Chemical Society
- 2017 – Arthur K. Doolittle Award, ACS PMSE Division
- 2015 – John D. and Catherine T. MacArthur Foundation Fellowship
- 2014 – Polymer International–IUPAC Award for Creativity in Applied Polymer Science
- 2013 – ACS National Fresenius Award
- 2013 – Camille Dreyfus Teacher-Scholar Award
- 2013 – ACS Arthur C. Cope Scholar Award
- 2012 – Beckman Young Investigators Award
- 2012 – Cottrell Scholar Award, Research Corporation
- 2011 – National Science Foundation CAREER Award

== Selected publications ==
Two-Dimensional Polymerization and Covalent Organic Frameworks

1. Bardot, M. I.; Weyrich, C. W.; Shi, Z.; Traxler, M.; Stern, C. L.; Cui, J.; Muller, D. A.; Becker, M. L.; Dichtel, W. R. “Mechanically Interlocked Two-Dimensional Polymers.” Science, 2025, 387, 264-269. DOI: 10.1126/science.ads4968
2. Natraj, A.; Landman, I. R.; Pelkowski, C. E.; Burke, D. W.; Kewalramani, S.; Dichtel, W. R.; “Nonclassical Crystallization Processes of Single-Crystalline Two-Dimensional Covalent Organic Frameworks.” J. Am. Chem. Soc. 2024, 146, 16775-16786, DOI: 10.1021/jacs.4c04674
3. Natraj, A.; Ji, W.; Xin, J.; Catano, I.; Burke, D. W.; Evans, A. M.; Strauss, M. J.; Ateia; M.; Hamachi, L. S.; Gianneschi, N. C.; Alothman, Z. A.; Sun, J.; Yusuf, K.; Dichtel, W. R.; “Single Crystalline Imine-Linked Two -Dimensional Covalent Organic Frameworks Separate Benzene and Cyclohexane Efficiently.” J. Am. Chem. Soc. 2022, 144, 19813–19824. DOI: 10.1021/jacs.2c07166
4. Evans, A.M.; Strauss, M.J.; Corcos, A.R.; Hirani, Z.; Ji, W.; Hamachi, L.S.; Aguilar-Enriquez, X.; Chavez, A.D.; Smith, B.J., and Dichtel, W.R. “Two-Dimensional Polymers and Polymerizations.” Chem. Rev. 2022, 122, 442-564. DOI: 10.1021/acs.chemrev.0c01184
5. Evans, A.M.; Giri, A.; Sangwan, V. K.; Xun, S.; Bartnof, M.; Torres-Castanedo, C. G.; Balch, H. B.; Rahn, M. S.; Bradshaw, N. P.; Vitaku, E.; Burke, D. W.; Li, H.; Bedzyk, M. J.; Wang, F.; Bredas, J.-L.; Malen, J. A.; McGaughey, A. J. H.; Hersam, M. C.; Dichtel, W. R.; Hopkins, P. E. “Thermally conductive ultra-low-k dielectric layers based on two-dimensional covalent organic frameworks.” Nature Mater. 2021, 20, 1142-1148, DOI: 10.1038/s41563-021-00934-3
6. Evans, A. M.; Parent, L. R.; Flanders, N. C.; Bisbey, R. P; Vitaku, E.; Chen, L. X.; Gianneschi, N. C.; Dichtel, W. R.; “Seeded Growth of Single-Crystal Two-Dimensional Covalent Organic Frameworks.” Science, 2018, 361, 52–57. DOI: 10.1126/science.aar7883
7. Smith, B. J.; Dichtel, W. R. “Mechanistic studies of two-dimensional covalent organic frameworks rapidly polymerized from initially homogenous conditions.” J. Am. Chem. Soc. 2014, 136, 8783–8789. DOI: 10.1021/ja5037868
8. DeBlase, C. R.; Silberstein, K. E.; Truong, T.; Abruña, H. D.; Dichtel, W. R. “β-Ketoenamine-linked covalent organic frameworks capable of pseudocapacitive energy storage.” J. Am. Chem. Soc. 2013, 135, 16821–16824. DOI: 10.1021/ja409421d
9. Colson, J. W.; Woll, A. R.; Mukherjee, A.; Levendorf, M. A.; Spitler, E. L.; Shields, V. S.; Spencer, M. A.; Park, J.; Dichtel, W. R.; “Oriented 2D covalent organic framework thin films on single layer graphene.” Science, 2011, 332, 228–231. DOI: 10.1126/science.1202747
10. Spitler, E. L.; Dichtel W. R.; “Lewis acid-catalysed formation of two-dimensional phthalocyanine covalent organic frameworks.” Nature Chem. 2010, 2, 672–677. DOI: 10.1038/nchem.695

Polymers for Removing Organic Pollutants and PFAS from Water

1. Lin, Z.-W.; Kim, S.; Dyakiv, Y.; Gedangoni, E. F. P.; Packman, A. I.; Helbling, D. E.; Getzinger, G. J.; Dichtel, W. R. “A Macroporous Cyclodextrin Monolith for Continuous Removal of Per- and Polyfluoroalkyl Substances from Water.” J. Am. Chem. Soc. 2025, 147, 33761-33769. DOI: 10.1021/jacs.5c09865
2. Wang, R.; Lin, Z. W.; Klemes, M. J.; Ateia, M.; Trang, B.; Wang, J.; Ching, C.; Helbling, D. E.; Dichtel, W.R. “A Tunable Porous Beta-Cyclodextrin Polymer Platform to Understand and Improve Anionic PFAS Removal.” ACS Cent. Sci. 2022, 8, 663-669. DOI: 10.1021/acscentsci.2c00478
3. Klemes, M. J.; Ling, Y.; Ching, C.; Wu, V.; Helbling, D. E.; Dichtel, W. R. “Reduction of a Tetrafluoroterephthalonitrile‐β‐Cyclodextrin Polymer to Remove Anionic Micropollutants and Perfluorinated Alkyl Substances from Water.” Angew. Chem. Int. Ed. 2019, 58, 12049-12053. DOI: 10.1002/anie.201905142
4. Xiao, L.; Ling, Y.; Alsbaiee, A.; Li, C.; Helbing, D. E.; Dichtel, W. R. “β-Cyclodextrin Polymer Network Sequesters Perfluorooctanoic Acid at Environmentally Relevant Concentrations.” J. Am. Chem. Soc. 2017, 139, 7689-7692. DOI: 10.1021/jacs.7b02381
5. Alsbaiee, A.; Smith, B. J.; Xiao, L.; Ling, Y.; Helbling, D. E.; Dichtel, W. R. “Rapid removal of organic micropollutants from water by a porous β-cyclodextrin polymer.” Nature, 2016, 529, 190–194. DOI: 10.1038/nature16185

Covalent Adaptable Networks / Vitrimers and Polyurethane Circularity

1. Kim, S.; Felsenthal, L. M.; Sala, O.; Welz, O.; Bergeler, M.; Alsbaiee, A.; Dichtel W. R. “Reprocessing Thermoset Polyurethane Foams Using Their Residual Polymerization Catalysts.” J. Am. Chem. Soc. 2025, 147, 35655-35663. DOI: 10.1021/jacs.5c11319
2. Kim, S.; Li, K.; Alsbaiee, A.; Brutman, J. P.; Dichtel, W. R. “Circular Reprocessing of Thermoset Polyurethane Foams.” Adv. Mater. 2023, 35, 2305387. DOI: 10.1002/adma.202305387
3. Elling, B. R.; Dichtel, W. R. “Reprocessable Cross-Linked Polymer Networks: Are Associative Exchange Mechanisms Desirable?” ACS Cent. Sci. 2020, 6, 1488-1496. DOI: 10.1021/acscentsci.0c00567
4. Sheppard, D. T.; Jin, K.; Hamachi, L. S; Dean, W.; Fortman, D. J.; Ellison, C. J.; Dichtel, W. R. “Reprocessing Postconsumer Polyurethane Foam Using Carbamate Exchange Catalysis and Twin-Screw Extrusion” ACS Cent. Sci. 2020, 6, 6, 921-927, DOI: 10.1021/acscentsci.0c00083
5. Fortman, D. J.; Brutman, J. A.; Cramer, C. J.; Hillmyer, M. A.; Dichtel, W. R. “Mechanically Activated, Catalyst-free Polyhydroxyurethane Vitrimers.” J. Am. Chem. Soc. 2015, 137, 14019–14022. DOI: 10.1021/jacs.5b08084
