= Avrami =

Avrami is a surname derived from the given name Abraham. Notable people with this surname or patronymic include:

- Mael Avrami Melvin (1913–2014), American physicist
- Thoma Avrami (1869–1943, Albanian poet, journalist, and activist of the Albanian National Awakening
