= Classical nucleation theory =

Theory of nucleation

Classical nucleation theory (CNT) is the most common theoretical model used to quantitatively study the kinetics of nucleation.

Nucleation is the first step in the spontaneous formation of a new thermodynamic phase or a new structure, starting from a state of metastability. The kinetics of formation of the new phase is frequently dominated by nucleation, such that the time to nucleate determines how long it will take for the new phase to appear. The time to nucleate can vary by orders of magnitude, from negligible to exceedingly large, far beyond reach of experimental timescales. One of the key achievements of classical nucleation theory is to explain and quantify this immense variation.

== Description ==
The central result of classical nucleation theory is a prediction for the rate of nucleation $R$, in units of (number of events)/(volume·time). For instance, a rate $R = 1000 \ \text{m}^{-3}\text{s}^{-1}$ in a supersaturated vapor would correspond to an average of 1000 droplets nucleating in a volume of 1 cubic meter in 1 second.

The CNT prediction for $R$ is

$$R\ =\ N_S Zj\exp \left( -\frac{\Delta G^*}{k_BT} \right)$$

where

- $\Delta G^*$ is the free energy cost of the nucleus at the top of the nucleation barrier, and $k_B T$ is the average thermal energy with $T$ the absolute temperature and $k_B$ the Boltzmann constant.
- $N_S$ is the number of nucleation sites.
- $j$ is the rate at which molecules attach to the nucleus.
- $Z$ is the Zeldovich factor, (named after Yakov Zeldovich) which gives the probability that a nucleus at the top of the barrier will go on to form the new phase, rather than dissolve.

This expression for the rate can be thought of as a product of two factors: the first, $N_S \exp \left( -\Delta G^*/k_BT \right)$, is the number of nucleation sites multiplied by the probability that a nucleus of critical size has grown around it. It can be interpreted as the average, instantaneous number of nuclei at the top of the nucleation barrier. Free energies and probabilities are closely related by definition. The probability of a nucleus forming at a site is proportional to $\exp[-\Delta G^*/kT]$. So if $\Delta G^*$ is large and positive the probability of forming a nucleus is very low and nucleation will be slow. Then the average number will be much less than one, i.e., it is likely that at any given time none of the sites has a nucleus.

The second factor in the expression for the rate is the dynamic part, $Zj$. Here, $j$ expresses the rate of incoming matter and $Z$ is the probability that a nucleus of critical size (at the maximum of the energy barrier) will continue to grow and not dissolve. The Zeldovich factor is derived by assuming that the nuclei near the top of the barrier are effectively diffusing along the radial axis. By statistical fluctuations, a nucleus at the top of the barrier can grow diffusively into a larger nucleus that will grow into a new phase, or it can lose molecules and shrink back to nothing. The probability that a given nucleus goes forward is $Z$.

Taking into consideration kinetic theory and assuming that there is the same transition probability in each direction, it is known that $x^2 = 2D t$. As $Zj$ determines the hopping rate, the previous formula can be rewritten in terms of the mean free path and the mean free time $\lambda^2 = 2D \tau$. Consequently, a relation of $Zj$ in terms of the diffusion coefficient is obtained

$Zj = \frac{1}{\tau} = \frac{2D}{\lambda^2}$.

Further considerations can be made in order to study temperature dependence. Therefore, Einstein-Stokes relation is introduced under the consideration of a spherical shape

$D = \frac{k_B T}{6 \pi \eta \lambda}$, where $\eta$ is the material's viscosity.

Considering the last two expressions, it is seen that $Zj$ $\propto T$. If $T \approx T_m$, being $T_m$ the melting temperature, the ensemble gains high velocity and makes $Zj$ and $\Delta G^*$ to increase and hence, $R$ decreases. If $T \ll T_m$, the ensemble has a low mobility, which makes $R$ to decrease as well.

To see how this works in practice we can look at an example. Sanz and coworkers have used computer simulation to estimate all the quantities in the above equation, for the nucleation of ice in liquid water. They did this for a simple but approximate model of water called TIP4P/2005. At a supercooling of 19.5 °C, i.e., 19.5 °C below the freezing point of water in their model, they estimate a free energy barrier to nucleation of ice of $\Delta G^*=275k_BT$. They also estimate a rate of addition of water molecules to an ice nucleus near the top of the barrier of $j = 10^{11} \ \text{s}^{-1}$ and a Zeldovich factor $Z = 10^{-3}$. The number of water molecules in 1 m^{3} of water is approximately 10^{28}. These leads to the prediction $R = 10^{-83} \ \text{s}^{-1}$, which means that on average one would have to wait 10^{83}s (10^{76} years) to see a single ice nucleus forming in 1 m^{3} of water at -20 °C!

This is a rate of homogeneous nucleation estimated for a model of water, not real water — in experiments one cannot grow nuclei of water and so cannot directly determine the values of the barrier $\Delta G^*$, or the dynamic parameters such as $j$, for real water. However, it may be that indeed the homogeneous nucleation of ice at temperatures near -20 °C and above is extremely slow and so that whenever water freezes at temperatures of -20 °C and above this is due to heterogeneous nucleation, i.e., the ice nucleates in contact with a surface.

=== Homogeneous nucleation ===
Homogeneous nucleation is much rarer than heterogeneous nucleation. However, homogeneous nucleation is simpler and easier to understand than heterogeneous nucleation, so the easiest way to understand heterogeneous nucleation is to start with homogeneous nucleation. So we will outline the CNT calculation for the homogeneous nucleation barrier $\Delta G^*$.

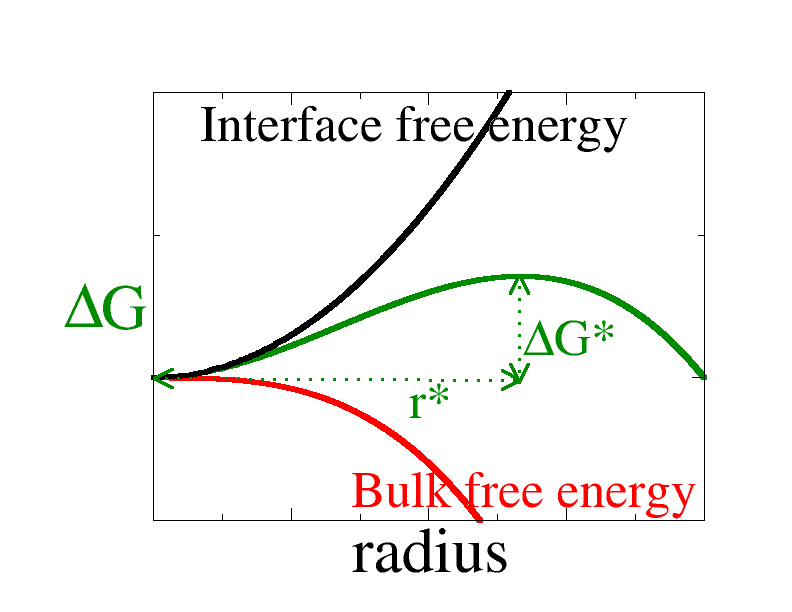
The green curve is the total (Gibbs if this is at constant pressure) free energy as a function of radius. Shown is the free energy barrier, $\Delta G^*$, and radius at the top of the barrier, $r*$. This total free energy is a sum of two terms. The first is a bulk term, which is plotted in red. This scales with volume and is always negative. The second term is an interfacial term, which is plotted in black. This is the origin of the barrier. It is always positive and scales with surface area.

To understand if nucleation is fast or slow, $\Delta G(r)$, the Gibbs free energy change as a function of the size of the nucleus, needs to be calculated. The classical theory assumes that even for a microscopic nucleus of the new phase, we can write the free energy of a droplet $\Delta G$ as the sum of a bulk term that is proportional to the volume of the nucleus, and a surface term, that is proportional to its surface area

$$\Delta G = \frac{4}{3} \pi r^3 \Delta g_v + 4 \pi r^2 \sigma$$

The first term is the volume term, and as we are assuming that the nucleus is spherical, this is the volume of a sphere of radius $r$. $\Delta g_v$ is the difference in free energy per unit of volume between the phase that nucleates and the thermodynamic phase nucleation is occurring in. For example, if water is nucleating in supersaturated air, then $\Delta g_v$ is the free energy per unit of volume of water minus that of supersaturated air at the same pressure. As nucleation only occurs when the air is supersaturated, $\Delta g_v$ is always negative. The second term comes from the interface at surface of the nucleus, which is why it is proportional to the surface area of a sphere. $\sigma$ is the surface tension of the interface between the nucleus and its surroundings, which is always positive.

For small $r$ the second surface term dominates and $\Delta G(r)>0$. The free energy is the sum of an $r^2$ and $r^3$ terms. Now the $r^3$ terms varies more rapidly with $r$ than the $r^2$ term, so as small $r$ the $r^2$ term dominates and the free energy is positive while for large $r$, the $r^3$ term dominates and the free energy is negative. This shown in the figure to the right. Thus at some intermediate value of $r$, the free energy goes through a maximum, and so the probability of formation of a nucleus goes through a minimum. There is a least-probable nucleus size, i.e., the one with the highest value of $\Delta G$

where

$\left[\frac{dG}{dr}\right]_{r=r_c} = 0 \implies r_c = \frac{2\sigma}{|\Delta g_v|}$

Addition of new molecules to nuclei larger than this critical radius, $r_c$, decreases the free energy, so these nuclei are more probable. The rate at which nucleation occurs is then limited by, i.e., determined by the probability, of forming the critical nucleus. This is just the exponential of minus the free energy of the critical nucleus $\Delta G^*$, which is

$$\Delta G^* = \frac{16 \pi \sigma ^3}{3|\Delta g_v|^2}$$

This is the free energy barrier needed in the CNT expression for $R$ above.

In the discussion above, we assumed the growing nucleus to be three-dimensional and spherical. Similar equations can be set up for other dimensions and/or other shapes, using the appropriate expressions for the analogues of volume and surface area of the nucleus. One will then find out that any non-spherical nucleus has a higher barrier height $\Delta G^*$ than the corresponding spherical nucleus. This can be understood from the fact that a sphere has the lowest possible surface area to volume ratio, thereby minimizing the (unfavourable) surface contribution with respect to the (favourable) bulk volume contribution to the free energy. Assuming equal kinetic prefactors, the fact that $\Delta G^*$ is higher for non-spherical nuclei implies that their formation rate is lower. This explains why in homogeneous nucleation usually only spherical nuclei are taken into account.

From an experimental standpoint, this theory grants tuning of the critical radius through the dependence of $\Delta G$ on temperature. The variable $\Delta g_v$, described above, can be expressed as

$$\Delta G = \frac{\Delta H_f(T_m - T)}{T_m} \implies \Delta g_v = \frac{\Delta H_f(T_m - T)}{V_{at} T_m}$$

where $T_m$ is the melting point and $H_f$ is the enthalpy of formation for the material. Furthermore, the critical radius can be expressed as

$$r_c\ =\ \frac{2\sigma}{\Delta H_f}\frac{V_{at} T_m}{T_m - T} \implies \Delta G^* = \frac{16\pi \sigma^3}{3 (\Delta H_f)^2}\left(\frac{V_{at} T_m}{T_m - T}\right)^2$$

revealing a dependence of reaction temperature. Thus as you increase the temperature near $T_m$, the critical radius will increase. Same happens when you move away from the melting point, the critical radius and the free energy will decrease.

=== Heterogeneous nucleation ===
Three droplets on a surface, illustrating decreasing contact angles. The contact angle the droplet surface makes with the solid horizontal surface decreases from left to right.

A diagram featuring all of the factors that affect heterogeneous nucleation

Unlike homogeneous nucleation, heterogeneous nucleation occurs on a surface or impurity. It is much more common than homogeneous nucleation. This is because the nucleation barrier for heterogeneous nucleation is much lower than for homogeneous nucleation. To see this, note that the nucleation barrier is determined by the positive term in the free energy $\Delta G$, which is proportional to the total exposed surface area of a nucleus. For homogeneous nucleation the surface area is simply that of a sphere. For heterogeneous nucleation, however, the surface area is smaller since part of the nucleus boundary is accommodated by the surface or impurity onto which it is nucleating.

There are several factors which determine the precise reduction in the exposed surface area. As shown in a diagram on the left, these factors include the size of the droplet, the contact angle, $\theta$, between the droplet and surface, and the interactions at the three phase interfaces: liquid-solid, solid-vapor, and liquid-vapor.

The free energy needed for heterogeneous nucleation, $\Delta G ^{het}$, is equal to the product of homogeneous nucleation, $\Delta G^{hom}$, and a function of the contact angle, $f(\theta)$:

$\Delta G^{het}= f(\theta) \Delta G^{hom}, \qquad f(\theta)=\frac{2-3\cos\theta+\cos^{3}\theta}{4}$.

The schematic to the right illustrates the decrease in the exposed surface area of the droplet as the contact angle decreases. Deviations from a flat interface decrease the exposed surface even further: there exist expressions for this reduction for simple surface geometries. In practice, this means that nucleation will tend to occur on surface imperfections.

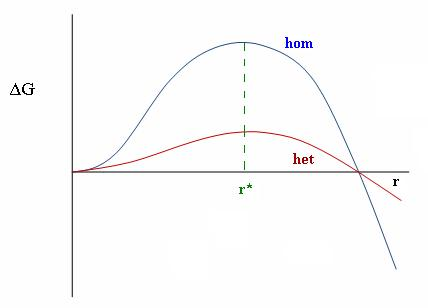
Difference in energy barriers

== Statistical mechanical treatment ==
The classical nucleation theory hypothesis for the form of $\Delta G$ can be examined more rigorously using the tools of statistical mechanics. Specifically, the system is modeled as a gas of non-interacting clusters in the grand canonical ensemble. A state of metastable equilibrium is assumed, such that the methods of statistical mechanics hold at least approximately. The grand partition function is

$$Q = \sum_{N=0}^{\infty}z^N \sum_{\mu_S | N} e^{-\beta \mathcal{H}_N(\mu_S)}, \qquad  z \equiv e^{\beta \mu}.$$

Here the inner summation is over all microstates $\mu_S$ which contain exactly $N$ particles. It can be decomposed into contributions from each possible combination of clusters which results in $N$ total particles. For instance,

$$\sum_{\mu_S | N = 3} e^{-\beta \mathcal{H}_3(\mu_S)} =  q_3 + q_2q_1 + \frac{1}{3!} q_1^3$$

where $q_n$ is the configuration integral of a cluster with $n$ particles and potential energy $U_n\left(\{\mathbf{r_n}\}\right)$:

$$\begin{align}
q_n = \frac{1}{n!} \frac{1}{\Lambda^{3n}} \int d \mathbf{r}^n e^{-\beta U_n\left(\{\mathbf{r_n}\}\right)}.
\end{align}$$

The quantity $\Lambda$ is the thermal de Broglie wavelength of the particle, which enters due to the integration over the $3n$ momentum degrees of freedom. The inverse factorials are included to compensate for overcounting, since particles and clusters alike are assumed indistinguishable.

More compactly,

$$Q = \exp \left[ \sum_{n=1}^{\infty} q_n z^n \right]$$.

Then, by expanding $Q$ in powers of $q_m z^m$, the probability $P(m,\ell)$ of finding exactly $\ell$ clusters which each has $m$ particles is

$$\begin{align}
P(m,\ell) &= \frac{z^{\ell m} q_{m}^{\ell}}{\ell!} \cdot \frac{\exp \left(\sum_{n \neq m}^{\infty} q_n z^n \right)}{\exp \left(\sum_{n =1}^{\infty} q_n z^n \right)} \\
&= \frac{z^{\ell m} q_{m}^{\ell}}{\ell!} \exp \left(-q_m z^m \right).
\end{align}$$

The number density $\rho_m$ of $m$-clusters can therefore be calculated as

$$\begin{align}
\rho_m &= \frac{1}{V} \sum_{\ell = 0}^{\infty} \ell \frac{z^{\ell m} q_{m}^{\ell}}{\ell!} \exp \left(-q_m z^m \right) \\
&= \frac{z^{m} q_{m}}{V}.
\end{align}$$

This is also called the cluster size distribution.

The grand potential $\Omega$ is equal to $-k_B T \ln Q$, which, using the thermodynamic relationship $\Omega = -p V$, leads to the following expansion for the pressure:

$$\frac{p}{k_B T} = \sum_{n=1}^{\infty} \frac{q_n}{V} z^n.$$

If one defines the right hand side of the above equation as the function $\Pi(T, z)$, then various other thermodynamic quantities can be calculated in terms of derivatives of $\Pi$ with respect to $z$.

The connection with the simple version of the theory is made by assuming perfectly spherical clusters, in which case $U_n\left(\{\mathbf{r_n}\}\right)$ depends only on $n$, in the form

$$U_n = -E_0 n + w n^{1/2}$$

where $E_0$ is the binding energy of a single particle in the interior of a cluster, and $w > 0$ is the excess energy per unit area of the cluster surface. Then, $q_n \propto \exp( -\beta \cdot (-E_0 n + w n^{1/2}))$, and the cluster size distribution is

$$\rho_n \propto e^{-\beta [ -(E_0 + \mu) n + w n^{1/2}]},$$

which implies an effective free energy landscape $\Delta G(n) = -(E_0 + \mu) n + w n^{1/2}$, in agreement with the form proposed by the simple theory.

On the other hand, this derivation reveals the significant approximation in assuming spherical clusters with $U_n\left(\{\mathbf{r_n}\}\right) = -E_0 n + w n^{1/2}$. In reality, the configuration integral $q_n$ contains contributions from the full set of particle coordinates $\{\mathbf{r_n}\}$, thus including deviations from spherical shape as well as cluster degrees of freedom such as translation, vibration, and rotation. Various attempts have been made to include these effects in the calculation of $q_n$, although the interpretation and application of these extended theories has been debated. A common feature is the addition of a logarithmic correction $\sim \ln n$ to $\Delta G(n)$, which plays an important role near the critical point of the fluid.

== Limitations ==
Classical nucleation theory makes a number of assumptions which limit its applicability. Most fundamentally, in the so-called capillarity approximation it treats the nucleus interior as a bulk, incompressible fluid and ascribes to the nucleus surface the macroscopic interfacial tension $\sigma$, even though it is not obvious that such macroscopic equilibrium properties apply to a typical nucleus of, say, 50 molecules across. In fact, it has been shown that the effective surface tension of small droplets is smaller than that of the bulk liquid.

In addition, the classical theory places restrictions on the kinetic pathways by which nucleation occurs, assuming clusters grow or shrink only by single particle adsorption/emission. In reality, merging and fragmentation of entire clusters cannot be excluded as important kinetic pathways in some systems. Particularly in dense systems or near the critical point – where clusters acquire an extended and ramified structure – such kinetic pathways are expected to contribute significantly. The behavior near the critical point also suggests the inadequacy, at least in some cases, of treating clusters as purely spherical.

Various attempts have been made to remedy these limitations and others by explicitly accounting for the microscopic properties of clusters. However, the validity of such extended models is debated. One difficulty is the exquisite sensitivity of the nucleation rate $R$ to the free energy $\Delta G^{*}$: even small discrepancies in the microscopic parameters can lead to enormous changes in the predicted nucleation rate. This fact makes first-principles predictions nearly impossible. Instead, models must be fit directly to experimental data, which limits the ability to test their fundamental validity.

Recent atomic electron tomography measurements of high- and medium-entropy alloy nanoparticles resolved the three-dimensional atomic structures of 8,160 crystal nuclei. The nuclei exhibited spatially graded structural order, with greater crystalline order near their cores and a continuous decrease toward their boundaries, in contrast to the spatially uniform, sharp-interface nuclei assumed in classical nucleation theory. A gradient nucleation pathways model was introduced to incorporate a spatially varying structural order parameter, recovering classical nucleation theory in the sharp-interface limit.

== Comparison with simulation and experiment ==
For simple model systems, modern computers are powerful enough to calculate exact nucleation rates numerically. An example is the nucleation of the crystal phase in a system of hard spheres, which is a simple model of colloids consisting of perfectly hard spheres in thermal motion. The agreement of CNT with the simulated rates for this system confirms that the classical theory is a reasonable approximation. For simple models CNT works quite well; however it is unclear if it describes complex (e.g., molecular) systems equally well. For example, in the context of vapor to liquid nucleation, the CNT predictions for the nucleation rate are incorrect by several orders of magnitude on an absolute scale — that is, without renormalizing with respect to experimental data. Nevertheless, certain variations on the classical theory have been claimed to represent the temperature dependence adequately, even if the absolute magnitude is inaccurate. Jones et al. computationally explored the nucleation of small water clusters using a classical water model. It was found that CNT could describe the nucleation of clusters of 8-50 water molecules well, but failed to describe smaller clusters. Corrections to CNT, obtained from higher accuracy methods such as quantum chemical calculations, may improve the agreement with experiment.
