= Modeling of polymer crystals =

Polymer crystals have different properties than simple atomic crystals. They possess high density and long range order. They do not possess isotropy, and therefore are anisotropic in nature, which means they show anisotropy and limited conformation space. However, just as atomic crystals have lattices, polymer crystals also exhibit a periodic structure called a lattice, which describes the repetition of the unit cells in the space. The simulation of polymer crystals is complex and not taken from only one state but from solid-state and fluid-state physics as well. Polymer crystals have unit cells that consist of tens of atoms, while the molecules themselves comprise 10^{4} To 10^{6} atoms.

== Computational methods ==
There are two methods for the study of polymer crystals: 1) optimization methods and 2) sampling methods. Optimization methods have some advantages over the sampling method, such as the localization of crystals in phase space. Sampling methods generally cannot localize the crystals, and thus there is no need of the assumptions of localization. Optimization methods include molecular mechanics and lattice dynamics and sampling methods include the Monte Carlo method and molecular dynamics. A brief discussion regarding the methods are as follows:

1. Optimization method: In this method, we use the optimization technique and optimize the polymer crystal. For this we consider an ideal case where the crystal is free of disorder (this is assumption). Now we have to express the relevant part of the energy surface which can be approximated by using Taylor series expansion to an arbitrary accuracy in small displacements about the local minimum energy structure. Here in optimization method, we introduce the wave vector and frequency of oscillation term because optimization involves the localization of crystals. We find elastic stiffness moduli here with which modeling is done.
2. Sampling method: There is no localization of crystals and this sampling method also remove the restriction of approximation of the lattice. There are many disadvantages of this method: a) The Monte Carlo method and molecular dynamics method must use very small polymer crystals for the simulation. These method simulate, approximate the polymers of the order of 10^{3} to 10^{4} with current generation computers. This is the boundary condition and atoms outside of the simulation box have to be in phase with the atom inside the box. b) Due to heavy computational burden, simple interatomic models are more prevalent in Monte Carlo method and molecular dynamics.

There is a variety of methods for studying polymer crystals by molecular simulation. It is especially important in polymer crystals to be cognizant of the limitations imposed by either the assumptions on which a method is based or the robustness of the simulation method.

== See also ==
- Polymer engineering
- Crystal system
- Crystal structure
- Liquid crystal
- Crystallography
- Conductive polymer
- Crystallization of polymers
- Path integrals in polymer science
- Multiscale modeling
