= John D. Hoffman =

American chemist and author (1922–2004)

John Drake Hoffman
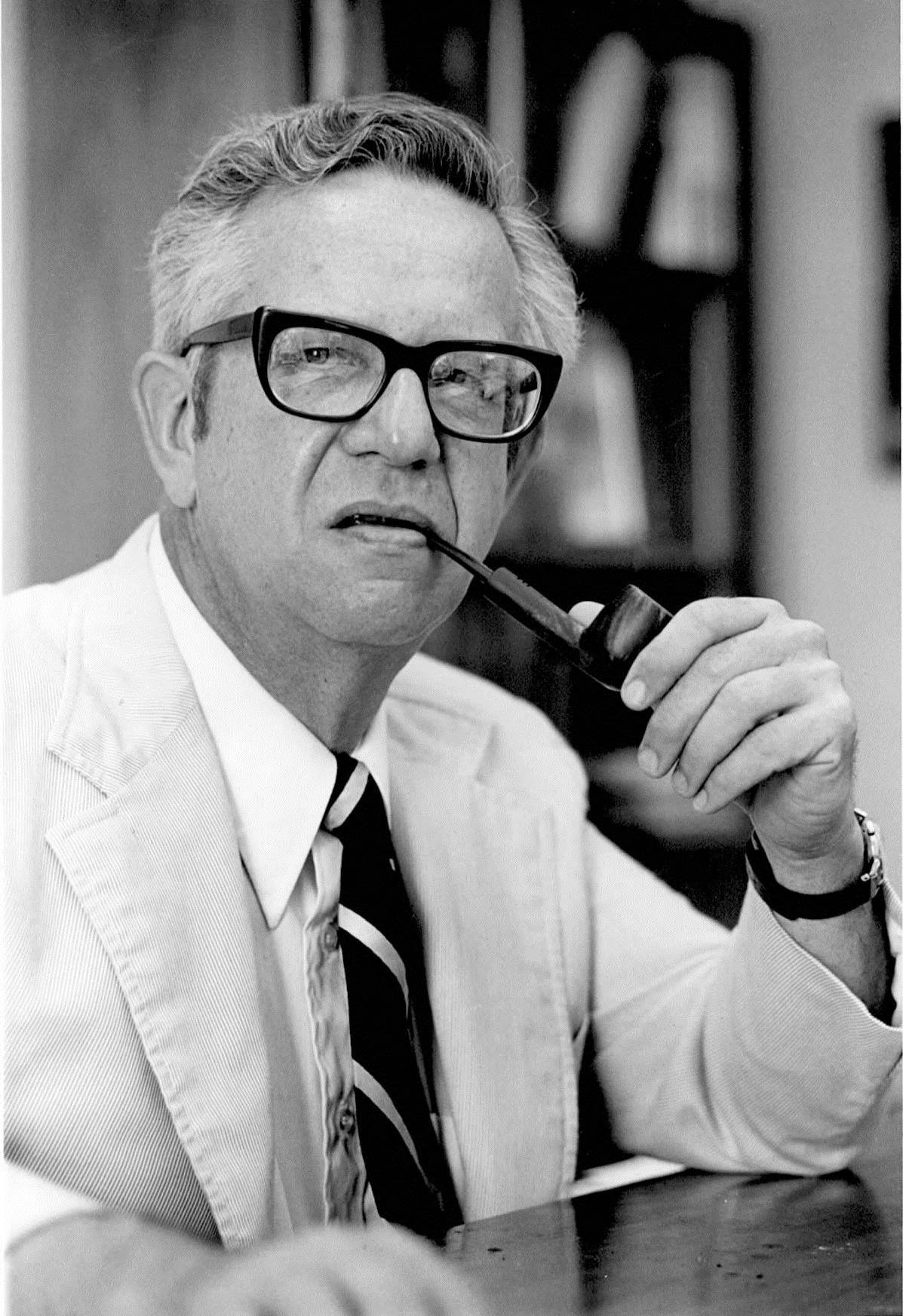
- Portrait of John Hoffman
- Born: November 26, 1922; Washington, D.C., U.S.
- Died: February 21, 2004 (aged 81); Washington, D.C., U.S.
- Resting place: Saint Paul's Lutheran Church Cemetery, Enterline, Pennsylvania
- Education: Franklin & Marshall College; Princeton University
- Known for: Hoffman nucleation theory
- Awards: Soldier's Medal; Department of Commerce Gold Medal; Presidential Rank Award of Meritorious Executive
- Scientific career
- Fields: Chemistry
- Workplaces: Manhattan District; General Electric; National Bureau of Standards; University of Maryland; Johns Hopkins University
- Thesis: The Dielectric Properties of Long Chain Compounds (1949)
- Doctoral advisor: Charles Phelps Smyth

John Drake Hoffman (November 26, 1922 – February 21, 2004) was an American chemist and author who was awarded the Soldier's Medal, the United States Army's highest award for an act of valor in a non-combat situation, and the only one awarded to a member of the Manhattan District. After the war he worked for the National Bureau of Standards, becoming the director of its national measurements laboratory. He was a professor and director of the engineering materials program at the University of Maryland from 1982 to 1985, director of the Michigan Molecular Institute, and a professor of materials science and engineering at Johns Hopkins University.

== Early life ==
John Drake Hoffman was born in Washington, D.C., on November 26, 1922. He grew up in Bethesda, Maryland, and attended Bethesda-Chevy Chase High School. He entered Franklin & Marshall College in Pennsylvania, graduating with a B.S. in chemistry in 1942.

== Manhattan Project ==
Hoffman served in the U.S. Army during World War II. In 1944, he was posted to the Special Engineer Detachment at the Clinton Engineer Works in Oak Ridge, Tennessee. In August 1944, he was one of ten enlisted men to volunteer for a dangerous special assignment: along with four civilians, they were sent to learn about a prototype liquid thermal diffusion uranium enrichment plant at the Philadelphia Navy Yard, part of the Manhattan Project's S-50 Project. This knowledge would be put to use at a larger, production plant then under construction at Oak Ridge.

On 2 September 1944, a 600-pound (270 kg) cylinder of highly corrosive uranium hexafluoride exploded. Nearby steam pipes ruptured, the steam reacting with the uranium hexafluoride to create hydrofluoric acid. Hoffman ran through the toxic cloud to rescue Private Arnold Kramish and two civilians, Peter N. Bragg Jr. (a United Naval Research Laboratory chemical engineer) and Douglas P. Meigs (a Fercleve Corporation employee). Bragg and Meigs died from their injuries but Kramish, Hoffman, and nine others recovered from burns and other injuries. Hoffman received the Soldier's Medal, the United States Army's highest award for valor in a non-combat situation, and the only one awarded to a member of the Manhattan District.

== Post-war ==
Hoffman left the army in 1946, and entered Princeton University, where he earned M.S. and Ph.D. degrees, writing his 1949 doctoral thesis on "The Dielectric Properties of Long Chain Compounds" under the supervision of Charles Phelps Smyth. He married Barbara Smith in 1949. They had three sons: James, John and Robert. After her death in 1980, he married Dolores Garcia. Through his second marriage he acquired two stepdaughters, Carol Wichers and Valerie Wichers-Calder.

After graduation, Hoffman worked at General Electric as a researcher from 1949 to 1954. He then joined the National Bureau of Standards as a research chemist. He became the chief of the Dielectrics Section in 1957, and of the Polymers Division in 1964. In 1967, he became the director of the Institute for Materials Research. Finally, in 1978, he became the Director of the National Measurement Laboratory. He retired from the Bureau of Standards in 1982. He was a professor at the University of Maryland from 1982 to 1985, and Director and CEO of the Michigan Molecular Institute from 1985 to 1990. Finally, he was professor of materials science and engineering at Johns Hopkins University. He was awarded the Department of Commerce Gold Medal in 1965, the Samuel Wesley Stratton Award of the National Bureau of Standards in 1967, and the Presidential Rank Award of Meritorious Executive. He published over 60 scientific papers, but is best remembered for his 1961 work with John I. Lauritzen on Hoffman nucleation theory.

Hoffman died from congestive heart failure at George Washington University Hospital on February 21, 2004.
