= Melvin metric =

Einstein field equation solution

In general relativity, the Melvin metric describes the geometry of spacetime containing a bundle of cylindrical symmetric magnetic or electric field pointing in the $z$-direction, held together by its own gravity. It was first obtained by William Bonnor in 1954, although it is named after Mael Melvin who rediscovered it in 1964. The Melvin magnetic solution is used in astrophysical models as a background for more complicated spacetimes. The concept is also referred to as "Melvin's magnetic universe".

Studying the Melvin universe is useful because the equations of general relativity are complex and nonlinear. Exact solutions even in unrealistically symmetric and limited cases is part of developing new ideas for realistic cases which may require numerical computation. The Melvin solution can be viewed as a spacetime with a uniform magnetic field whose own stress-energy concentrates space close to the symmetry axis.

Qualitatively, the Melvin metric relates to the idea that an intense gravitational field such as in a black hole would hold magnetic field lines together similar to the way an iron bar does. The magnetic field energy reacts to gravity—gravitates—because energy is equivalent to mass; conversely the field creates gravitiation force. However, the two dimensional cylindrical geometry of Melvin's metric fails the hoop conjecture: the magnetic field line repulsion cannot be overcome by gravitational forces.

Nevertheless, the interaction between magnetic fields and intense gravity of black holes is studied by astrophysicists leading to analysis of "Schwarzschild–Melvin black holes" and, when rotation is added, "Kerr–Melvin black holes". Models of Kerr–Melvin black holes have been compared to the M87* images by the Event Horizon Telescope to infer the strength of the star's magnetic field. Gray regions in the image are believed to be caused by photons trapped in stable orbits by the Melvin magnetic field effects.

== Description ==
The Melvin metric is given in axisymmetric coordinates by

$$ds^2 = f^2(-dt^2 + dz^2 + dr^2) + \frac{r^2}{f^2} d\phi^2 , \quad f = 1 + \frac{B^2 r^2}{4},$$

with $t , z \in (-\infty, + \infty), r \in [0, \infty), \phi \in [0, 2\pi)$, and $B$ parametrizing the strength of the electromagnetic field. The nonzero components of the Einstein tensor are

$$G_{tt} = G_{rr} = \frac{B^2}{f^2} , \quad G_{zz} = -\frac{B^2}{f^2} ,  G_{\phi\phi} = \frac{B^2 r^2}{f^6}$$

The metric follows from an electromagnetic field configuration described by a complex self-dual field strength tensor

$$F + i \tilde F = e^{-i\psi} B(dz \wedge dt + f^{-2}r dr \wedge d\phi),$$

where $\psi$ is the duality rotation parameter that parametrizes a family of solutions and $\tilde F$ is the Hodge dual field strength tensor. For $\psi = \pi/2$, we have $F = Bf^{-2} r \; dr \wedge d \phi$, a magnetic field oriented in the $z$-direction while for $\psi = 0$ we have $F = Bdz \wedge dt$, which describes an electric field pointing along the z-direction. For the magnetic solution, the nonzero components of field strength tensor are

$$F_{r\phi} = - F_{\phi r} = \frac{Br}{f^2}.$$

From the form of the stress-energy tensor for a source-free electromagnetic field

$$T_{\mu\nu} = \frac{1}{4\pi} \left(F_{\mu\rho}F_{\nu}^{\;\rho} - \frac{1}{4} g_{\mu\nu}F_{\rho \sigma}F^{\rho \sigma}\right),$$

the non-zero components of the stress-energy tensor are found to be

$$T_{tt} =  T_{rr} = - T_{zz}= \frac{B^2}{8\pi f^2} , \quad T_{\phi\phi} = \frac{B^2 r^2}{8\pi f^6},$$

which matches the result acquired from the Einstein tensor.
