= Mael Avrami Melvin =

American physicist

Mael Avrami Melvin (1913 – October 1, 2014) was an American physicist. His initial research was in metallurgy and materials science. In this area he is best known for the Avrami equation and for the Melvin metric. After his defense work in World War II he dropped out of science for a while and changed his name. His later work was in many fields of physics and he was elected a Fellow of the American Physical Society.

== Early life and education ==
Avrami was born in Mandatory Palestine in 1913 to American parents who were visiting the country. He was originally named Moshe Yoel Avrami, but his parents changed his name to Melvin when they returned to the United States. He studied theoretical physics at the University of Chicago where he received a B.S. in 1933, a M.S. in 1935 and a Ph.D. in 1938. While completing his doctoral education he worked at U. S. Steel's Gary Works as a metallurgist.

== Career ==
Melvin left the steel industry in 1938 when he took up a faculty position at Columbia University and worked in the physics and metallurgy departments. After a sabbatical from 1948 to 1952, in which he worked on the application of a theory of generalized symmetry to quantum theory and electrodynamics, he joined the Florida State University as a professor of physics. In 1947 he changed his name to Mael Avrami Melvin. From 1966 until his retirement he was professor at Temple University. He died on October 1, 2014, in Santa Barbara, California.
