= Avrami equation =

Description of constant-temperature solid phase changes

The transformation of one phase from another by the growth of nuclei forming randomly in the parent phase

The Avrami equation describes how solids transform from one phase to another at constant temperature. It can specifically describe the kinetics of crystallisation, can be applied generally to other changes of phase in materials, like chemical reaction rates, and can even be meaningful in analyses of ecological systems.

The equation is also known as the Johnson–Mehl–Avrami–Kolmogorov (JMAK) equation. The equation was first derived by Johnson, Mehl, Avrami and Kolmogorov (in Russian) in a series of articles published in the Journal of Chemical Physics between 1939 and 1941. Moreover, Kolmogorov treated statistically the crystallization of a solid in 1937.

== Transformation kinetics ==
Typical isothermal transformation plot (top). The transformation can be described using the Avrami equation as a plot of $\ln\ln{\tfrac{1}{1-Y}}$ vs $\ln{t}$, yielding a straight line.

Transformations are often seen to follow a characteristic s-shaped, or sigmoidal, profile where the transformation rates are low at the beginning and the end of the transformation but rapid in between.

The initial slow rate can be attributed to the time required for a significant number of nuclei of the new phase to form and begin growing. During the intermediate period the transformation is rapid as the nuclei grow into particles and consume the old phase while nuclei continue to form in the remaining parent phase.

Once the transformation approaches completion, there remains little untransformed material for further nucleation, and the production of new particles begins to slow. Additionally, the previously formed particles begin to touch one another, forming a boundary where growth stops.

== Derivation ==
The simplest derivation of the Avrami equation makes a number of significant assumptions and simplifications:

- Nucleation occurs randomly and homogeneously over the entire untransformed portion of the material.
- The growth rate does not depend on the extent of transformation.
- Growth occurs at the same rate in all directions.

If these conditions are met, then a transformation of $\alpha$ into $\beta$ will proceed by the nucleation of new particles at a rate $\dot{N}$ per unit volume, which grow at a rate $\dot{G}$ into spherical particles and only stop growing when they impinge upon each other. During a time interval $0 < \tau < t$, nucleation and growth can only take place in untransformed material. However, the problem is more easily solved by applying the concept of an extended volume – the volume of the new phase that would form if the entire sample was still untransformed. During the time interval $\tau$ to $\tau+\mathrm{d}\tau$ the number of nuclei N that appear in a sample of volume V will be given by

$$\mathrm{d}N = V\dot{N}\,\mathrm{d}\tau,$$

where $\dot{N}$ is one of two parameters in this simple model: the nucleation rate per unit volume, which is assumed to be constant. Since growth is isotropic, constant and unhindered by previously transformed material, each nucleus will grow into a sphere of radius $\dot{G}(t - \tau)$, and so the extended volume of $\beta$ due to nuclei appearing in the time interval will be

$$\mathrm{d}V_\beta^e = \frac{4\pi}{3} \dot{G}^3(t - \tau)^3 V\dot{N}\,d\tau,$$

where $\dot{G}$ is the second of the two parameters in this simple model: the growth velocity of a crystal, which is also assumed constant. The integration of this equation between $\tau = 0$ and $\tau = t$ will yield the total extended volume that appears in the time interval:

$$V_\beta^e = \frac{\pi}{3} V\dot{N}\dot{G}^3 t^4.$$

Only a fraction of this extended volume is real; some portion of it lies on previously transformed material and is virtual. Since nucleation occurs randomly, the fraction of the extended volume that forms during each time increment that is real will be proportional to the volume fraction of untransformed $\alpha$. Thus

$$\mathrm{d}V_\beta = \mathrm{d}V_\beta^e \left(1 - \frac{V_\beta}{V} \right),$$

rearranged

$$\frac{1}{1 - V_\beta/V}\,\mathrm{d}V_\beta = \mathrm{d}V_\beta^e,$$

and upon integration:

$$\ln(1 - Y) = -V_\beta^e/V,$$

where Y is the volume fraction of $\beta$, i.e. $V_\beta/V$.

Given the previous equations, this can be reduced to the more familiar form of the Avrami (JMAK) equation, which gives the fraction of transformed material after a hold time at a given temperature:

$$Y = 1 - \exp[-K\cdot t^n],$$

where $K = \pi\dot{N}\dot{G}^3/3$, and $n = 4$.

This can be rewritten as

$$\ln\big(-\ln[1 - Y(t)]\big) = \ln K + n \ln t,$$

which allows the determination of the constants n and $K$ from a plot of $\ln{\left(\ln{\tfrac{1}{1-Y}}\right)}$ vs $\ln{t}$. If the transformation follows the Avrami equation, this yields a straight line with slope n and intercept $\ln{K}$.

== Final crystallite (domain) size ==
Crystallization is largely over when $Y$ reaches values close to 1, which will be at a crystallization time $t_X$ defined by $Kt_X^n \sim 1$, as then the exponential term in the above expression for $Y$ will be small. Thus crystallization takes a time of order

$$t_X \sim \frac{1}{\left(\dot{N}\dot{G}^3\right)^{1/4}},$$

i.e., crystallization takes a time that decreases as one over the one-quarter power of the nucleation rate per unit volume, $\dot{N}$, and one over the three-quarters power of the growth velocity $\dot{G}$. Typical crystallites grow for some fraction of the crystallization time $t_X$ and so have a linear dimension $\dot{G} t_X$, or

$$\text{crystallite linear size} \sim \dot{G} t_X \sim \left(\frac{\dot{G}}{\dot{N}}\right)^{1/4},$$

i.e., the one quarter power of the ratio of the growth velocity to the nucleation rate per unit volume. Thus the size of the final crystals only depends on this ratio, within this model, and as we should expect, fast growth rates and slow nucleation rates result in large crystals. The average volume of the crystallites is of order this typical linear size cubed.

This all assumes an exponent of $n = 4$, which is appropriate for the uniform (homogeneous) nucleation in three dimensions. Thin films, for example, may be effectively two-dimensional, in which case if nucleation is again uniform the exponent $n = 3$. In general, for uniform nucleation and growth, $n = D + 1$, where $D$ is the dimensionality of space in which crystallization occurs.

== Interpretation of Avrami constants ==
Originally, n was held to have an integer value between 1 and 4, which reflected the nature of the transformation in question. In the derivation above, for example, the value of 4 can be said to have contributions from three dimensions of growth and one representing a constant nucleation rate. Alternative derivations exist, where n has a different value.

If the nuclei are preformed, and so all present from the beginning, the transformation is only due to the 3-dimensional growth of the nuclei, and n has a value of 3.

An interesting condition occurs when nucleation occurs on specific sites (such as grain boundaries or impurities) that rapidly saturate soon after the transformation begins. Initially, nucleation may be random, and growth unhindered, leading to high values for n (3 or 4). Once the nucleation sites are consumed, the formation of new particles will cease.

Furthermore, if the distribution of nucleation sites is non-random, then the growth may be restricted to 1 or 2 dimensions. Site saturation may lead to n values of 1, 2 or 3 for surface, edge and point sites respectively.

== Applications in biophysics ==
The Avrami equation was applied in cancer biophysics in two aspects. First aspect is connected with tumor growth and cancer cells kinetics, which can be described by the sigmoidal curve. In this context the Avrami function was discussed as an alternative to the widely used Gompertz curve. In the second aspect the Avrami nucleation and growth theory was used together with multi-hit theory of carcinogenesis to show how the cancer cell is created. The number of oncogenic mutations in cellular DNA can be treated as nucleation particles which can transform whole DNA molecule into cancerous one (neoplastic transformation). This model was applied to clinical data of gastric cancer, and shows that Avrami's constant n is between 4 and 5 which suggest the fractal geometry of carcinogenic dynamics. Similar findings were published for breast and ovarian cancers, where n=5.3.

== Multiple Fitting of a Single Dataset (MFSDS) ==
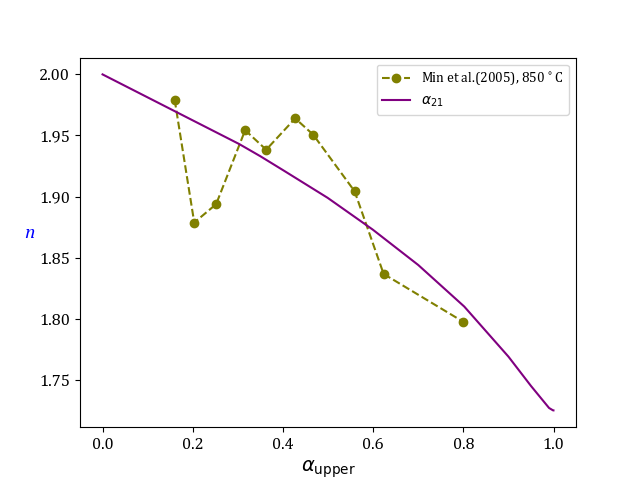
Multiple Fitting of a Single Data Set. The Avrami equation was used to fit multiple times a dataset published by Min et al. in 2005.

The Avrami equation was used by Ivanov et al. to fit multiple times a dataset generated by another model, the so called α_{Dg} to a sequence of the upper values of α, always starting from α=0, in order to generate a sequence of values of the Avrami parameter n. This approach was shown effective for a given experimental dataset, see the plot, and the n values obtained follow the general direction predicted by fitting multiple times the α_{21} model.
