= Robert Franklin Mehl =

American metallurgist (1898–1976)

Robert Franklin Mehl (March 30, 1898 – January 29, 1976) was an American metallurgist. Mehl was noted for transforming of nineteenth-century metallurgy into the modern materials science. He was the founder and the head of a division of Physical metallurgy at the Naval Research Laboratory and a member of the National Academy of Sciences. The American Institute of Mining and Metallurgical Engineers established a gold medal award in his name in 1973.

== Notable awards, distinctions and honors ==
- the Matthewson Medal of the Metallurgical Society of the AIME (five times between 1934 and 1947)
- the Howe Medal of the ASM (1939)
- the gold medals of both the ASM (1952) and the AIME (1945)
- the Le Chatelier Medal of the Société Française de Metallurgie (1956)
- four honorary doctorates
- and election to the National Academy of Sciences in 1958

== Life and career ==
Mehl was born in Lancaster, Pennsylvania. He graduated from Franklin and Marshall College in 1919. Mehl received his Ph.D. in physical chemistry and metallurgy from Princeton University in 1924.

Mehl is the great grandfather of Jason Mehl, a sculptor who works in metal, and Sean Mehl, the guitarist of Dead to a Dying World.
