= Topochemical polymerization =

Polymerization after alignment of monomers by crystallisation

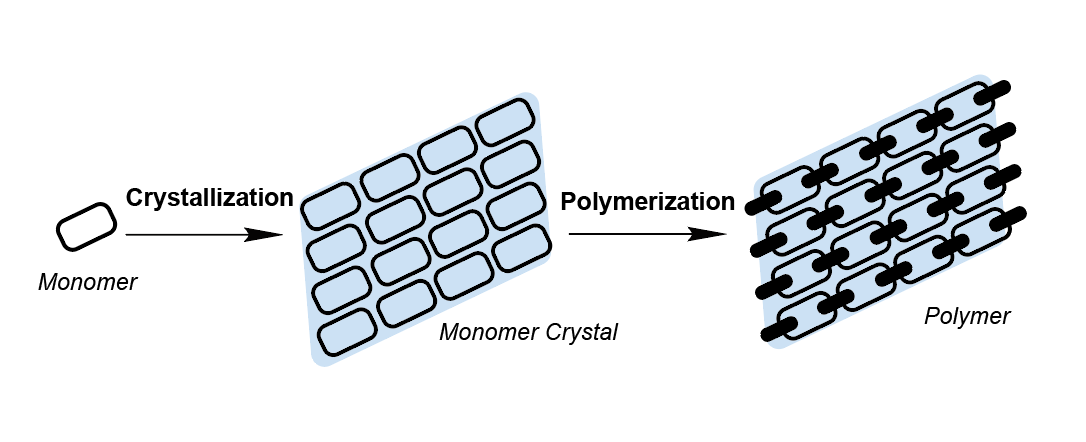
Schematic diagram of topochemical polymerization, the monomer is first crystallized and polymerized to give the polymer product.

Topochemical polymerization is a polymerization method performed by monomers aligned in the crystal state. In this process, the monomers are crystallised and polymerised under external stimuli such as heat, light, or pressure. Compared to traditional polymerisation, the movement of monomers is confined by the crystal lattice in topochemical polymerisation, giving rise to polymers with high crystallinity, tacticity, and purity. Topochemical polymerisation can also be used to synthesise unique polymers such as polydiacetylene that are otherwise hard to prepare.

Various reactions have been adopted in the field of topochemical polymerisation, such as [2+2], [4+2], [4+4], and [3+2] cycloaddition, linear addition between dienes, trienes, diacetylenes. Other than linear polymers, they can also be applied to the synthesis of two dimensional covalent networks.

== History ==
The term "topochemistry" was first introduced by Kohlschütter in 1919, referring to the chemical reactions driven by the molecular alignments within the crystal. The prefix "topo" came from the Greek word "topos", which means "site". These reactions quickly draw people's attention because of their high conversion as well as solvent/catalyst-free nature. However, the early studies were usually serendipitous.

In the 1960s, Schmidt's work on [2+2] photodimerization of cinnamic acids established the systematic approach to study the topochemical reactions. They proposed that only double bonds adopting coplanar and parallel orientation within a distance of 3.5-4.2 Å could react with each other in the crystal lattice. This empirical rule was later referred to as Schmidt's criteria.

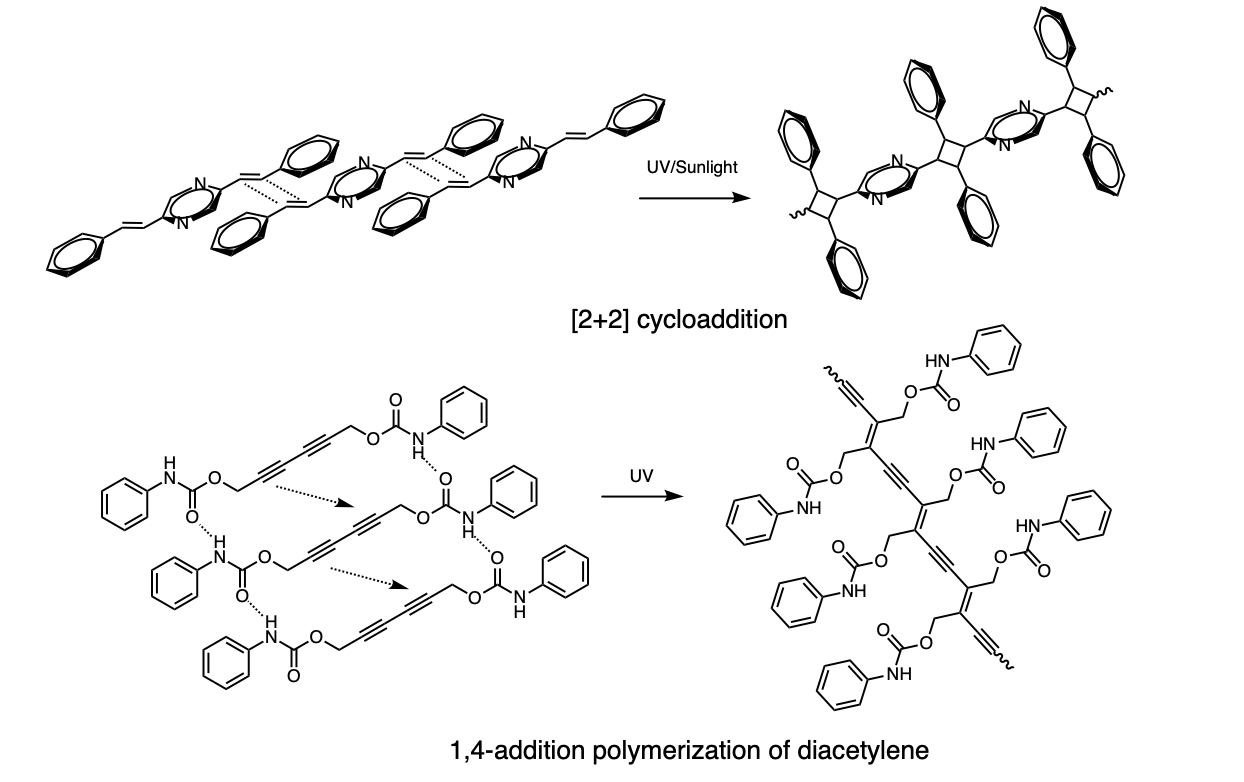
Two early examples of topochemical polymerization

[2+2] cycle addition and diacetylene polymerization are among the early examples of topochemical polymerization. As shown in the figure, the formation of 1,3-diphenyl substituted cyclobutane derivatives was first studied in detail by Hasegawa and his coworkers in 1967. A series of similar monomers had also been studied by them. In 1969, the 1,4-addition polymerization of diacetylene was confirmed by Wegner and his coworkers. Restricted by the experimental condition, early researchers of topochemical polymerization usually characterized the reaction process and product with traditional chemical methods. The development of modern analysis technology such as single-crystal X-ray diffraction greatly facilitated the systematic study of topochemical polymerization and kept the popularity till these days.

== Design of the reaction system ==
=== Lattice criteria of polymerization ===
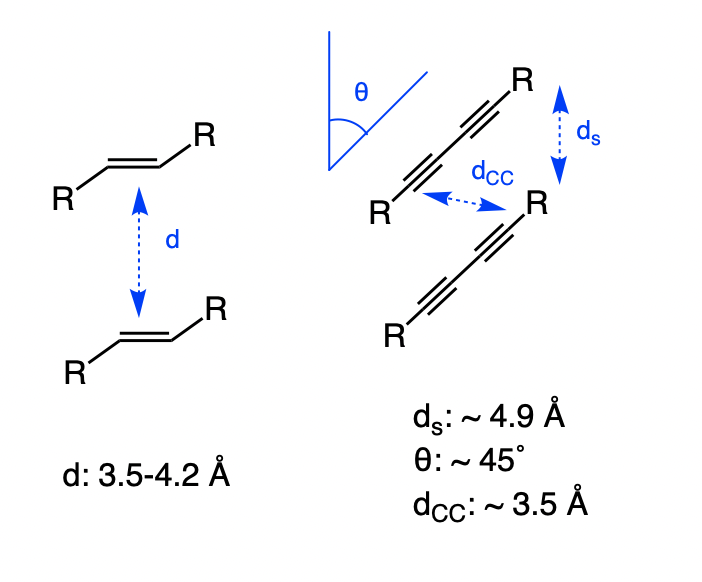
Two criteria of topochemical polymerization

In topochemical polymerization, little room is provided for the monomer to adjust their position. Thus, the reacting sites of the monomer should be pre-packed in a suitable manner. If [2+2] cycloaddition is involved in the polymerization, then the alignment of double bonds within the crystal should fulfill the aforementioned Schmidt's criteria. Sometimes multiple parameters should be considered. As shown in the figure, for example, the 1,4-polymerization of diacetylene requires the fine adjustment of angle as well as the monomer packing distance to achieve a satisfying reaction site distance d_{CC} (distance between C1 and C4).

The method invented by Schmidt is still the most promising way to investigate the structural criteria of polymerization. In this approach, a series of monomers with different substituents are crystallized and characterized by single-crystal X-ray diffractometer. By comparing their polymerization reactivity and slightly different structure, the suitable range of lattice parameters can be derived.

Though Schmidt's criteria are generally useful for predicting the topochemical reactivity, there are many instances of violation of these criteria. Many examples of smooth reaction of crystals that are not expected to be reactive based on Schmidt's criteria are reported.

=== Strategies of lattice control ===
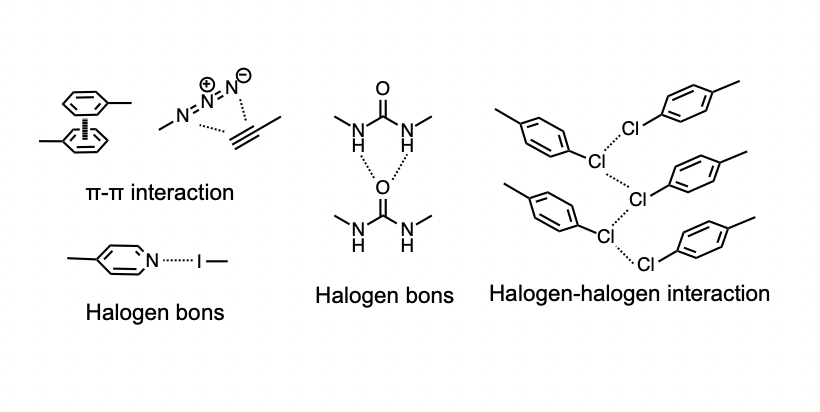
Interaction within the lattices has been reported in topochemical polymerization

Various methods have been proposed to achieve the suitable alignment of monomers in the crystal. These methods can be divided into two categories:

An obvious method is to introduce supramolecular interactions to the monomer. Popular choices include π - π stacking interactions, hydrogen/halogen bonding interactions, and Coulomb interactions. These interactions are sometimes inherent properties of reaction groups, such as π-π interaction between azide and acetylene group, or stacking force between biphenylethylene unit. Sometimes the side groups are introduced to form a network within the crystal.

The other strategy is to take advantage of the so-called "host-guest" assembly. In this case, the monomer is designed to link to a "host" molecule, while the host molecule is in charge of forming the ordered network. The host molecule stays intact during the polymerization. Such strategies simplify the synthesis of monomer.

=== The stress of polymerization ===
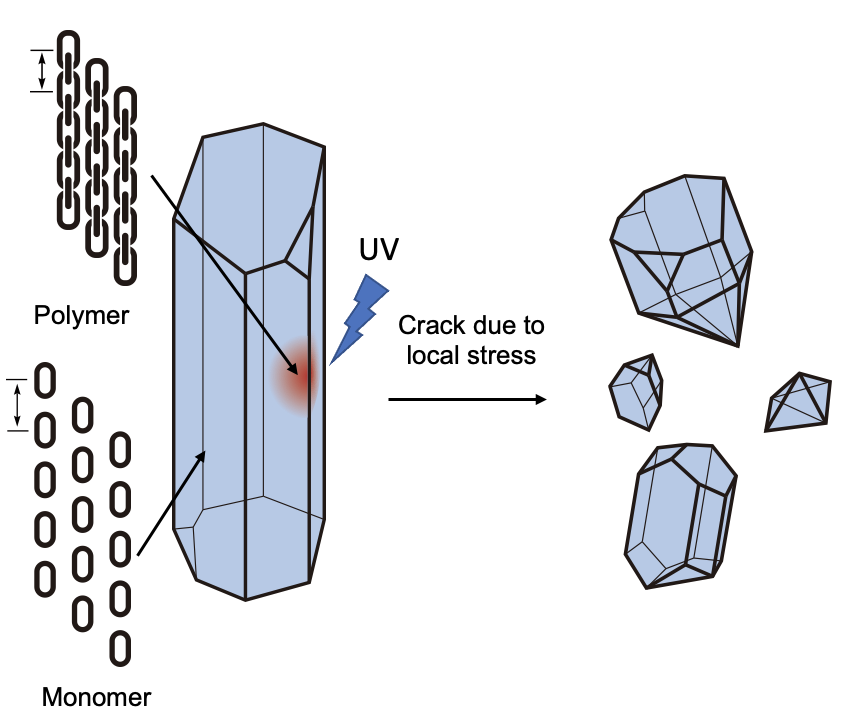
How the stress of polymerization causes the crystal to break.

Although the movement of the mass center of the monomer is restricted by the crystal during the polymerization, the slight change of the bond length before and after the reaction give rise to the shifting of lattice parameters. Consider a real-life topochemical polymerization initiated by irradiation: if monomer beneath the surface polymerizes later due to the light absorption near the surface, the already polymerized layer will shrink or expand, causing unbalanced stress within the crystal. The crystal might break or even lose crystallinity if the stress isn't handled properly.

Using elastic interaction such as weak hydrogen bonds is a common strategy to release the stress. It has been found that the bond length of the hydrogen bond in the crystal would change after polymerization, acting as cushion. Another possible routine is to introduce "soft" parts (C-C or C-O bond free to rotate instead of rigid conjugated system) in the monomer molecule. But it will in turn increase the difficulty of crystallization.

== Reaction condition ==
=== Light irradiation ===
Light irradiation can initiate the reaction while avoiding exerting additional physical effects on the monomer crystal. It can be used in topochemical polymerization based on free radical mechanism such as 1,4-polymerization of diacetylene or diene polymerization. UV light is widely used as initiation method as it does in conventional polymerization. In some circumstances, however, the polymerization initiated by UV light is so slow that unbalanced pressure will accumulate more easily as previously stated. γ-irradiation can trigger the reaction faster due to the shorter wavelength. Thus, it was proved to be a better choice than UV in various reactions such as topochemical polymerization of 1,3-diene carboxylic acid derivatives.

=== Heat ===
Heat can be used to trigger topochemical polymerization. Thermal topochemical reactions offer several advantages over photochemical reactions for the synthesis of crystalline polymers and other functional materials. Unlike photochemical reactions, which require the penetration and absorption of light by appropriately absorbing chromophores and may suffer from limited light penetration, non-uniform irradiation and competing photophysical processes, thermal reactions can be initiated simply by heating the crystal. Heat can be transferred relatively uniformly throughout the crystalline material, enabling reactions to proceed throughout the bulk crystal, including in optically opaque, thick or large crystals. Furthermore, thermal activation facilitates molecular motions, conformational changes and lattice dynamics to overcome geometric constraints and facilitate reactions that may not be feasible in the static crystal structure. This is particularly advantageous because molecular movements induced by heating can enable reactive groups to attain suitable geometry for bond formation. A variety of thermally induced topochemical reactions have been successfully exploited for crystalline polymer synthesis. For example, Kana M. Sureshan et al. have developed a series of bio-compatible polymer crystals based on [3+2] Topochemical Azide-Alkyne Cycloaddition (TAAC) reaction, [3+2] Topochemical Ene-Azide Cycloaddition (TEAC) reaction, Topochemical Diels-Alder Cycloaddition (TDAC) reaction, and topochemical Alkyne Nitrile-Oxide Cycloaddition (TANOC) reaction. Contrary to the light-initiated topochemical polymerization, the lower temperature and slower reaction rate would produce high quality polymer crystals. This is due to the fact that heat expansion is not obvious in lower temperature. These reactions provide versatile routes to crystalline polymers with controlled connectivity, regioselectivity and stereochemistry.

(i) Topochemical Azide-Alkyne Cycloaddition (TAAC) reaction

(ii) Topochemical Ene-Azide Cycloaddition (TEAC) reaction

(iii) Topochemical Diels-Alder Cycloaddition (TDAC) reaction

(iv) Topochemical Alkyne Nitrile-Oxide Cycloaddition (TANOC) reaction

=== Pressure ===
Topochemical polymerization can also be triggered by pressure. It has been reported that the cocrystal of diododiacetylene (guest) and bispyridyl oxalamide (host) could be polymerized under pressure. Interestingly, no polymerization was observed under light or heat due to the unfavorable distance between diacetylene units. The researcher postulated that the high pressure might "squeeze" the reactive site together and initiate the polymerization.

== Application ==
=== Tacticity/stereochemistry Control ===
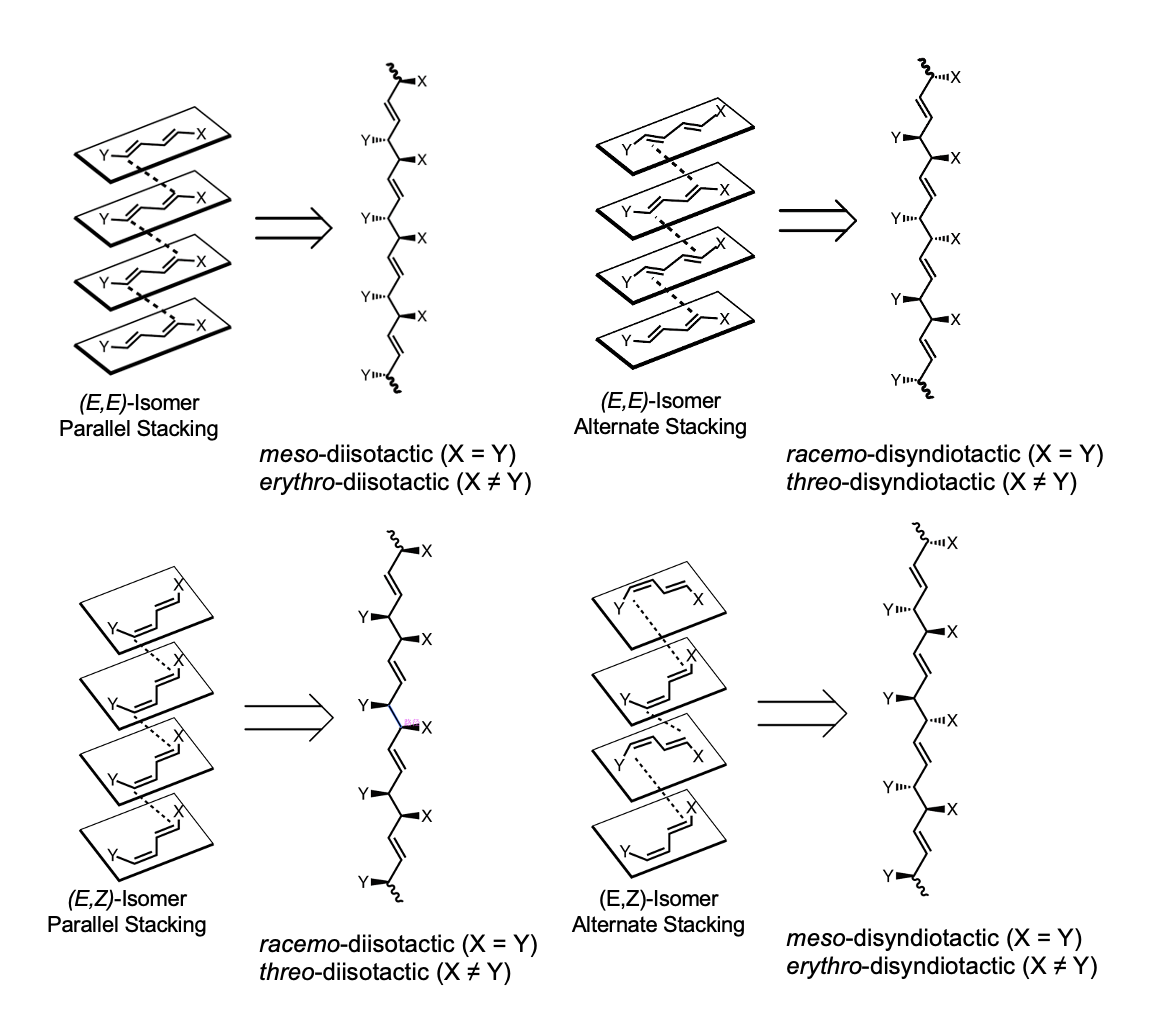
Control of tacticity in topochemical polymerization

Tactic and stereoselective polymerizations are traditionally catalyzed by metal-organic complexes. Topochemical polymerization provides an additional choice. In addition, by changing the alignment of the monomer within the crystal, the tacticity/stereochemistry of the polymer product could be easily controlled. An intuitive example is shown in the figure. In topochemical polymerization of 1,3-diene carboxylic acid derivatives, polymers with four different configurations can be prepared. Their structural relationships with the monomer packing are also shown in the figure.

=== Single crystal polymer ===
Single crystal polymers have unique applications in various fields Compared to single crystals of small molecules. Because of the long chain and various conformation, it is hard for the polymers to be crystallized directly from solution. Few examples of polymer single crystals prepared in this way suffered from low quality and small size. Topochemical polymerization provides a potential solution to yield high-quality polymer single crystals.

If the polymer is still mono crystalline, the transformation from single-crystal monomer to polymer is called single-crystal-to-single-crystal (SCSC) transformation, which required a more sophisticated design than normal topochemical polymerization. In order to prevent the polymer from breaking into polycrystalline powder, the stress-releasing strategies should be carefully considered. However, the study on general criteria of SCSC transition is still in its infancy and requires further study.

=== Coordination polymer ===
In addition to organic polymers, coordination polymers can also be prepared with topochemical polymerization. The various conformations of metal-organic complexes provide large libraries of monomer geometry. In addition, the length and angle of metal-ligand bonds are relatively flexible so that stress generated by polymerization is able to be released.

=== 2-D polymers ===
The Two-dimensional (2-D) polymers formed by topochemical polymerization are popular topics in material chemistry. By synthesizing and polymerizing monomers with functionality greater than 2, the 2-D networks instead of linear polymers can be obtained. [4+4] and [4+2] involving anthracene units are popular choices for 2D-polymer synthesis. 2-D covalent networks with high crystallinity can be produced in this way in high conversion. Recently, schluter et al. synthesized a 2D polymer via 2+2 topochemical cycloaddition reaction.
