= Electrical conductor =

Object or material which allows the flow of electric charge with little energy loss

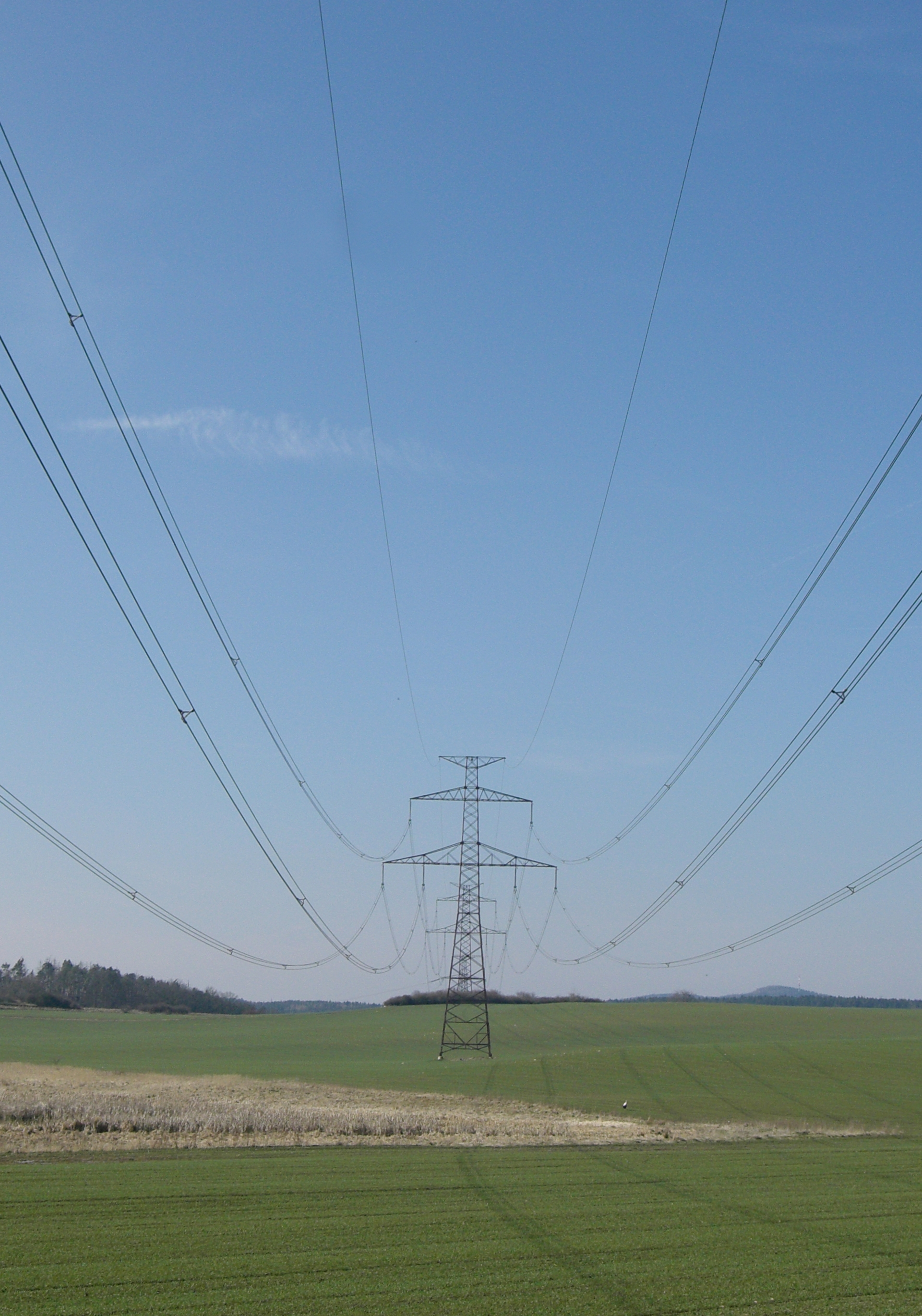
Overhead conductors carry electric power from generating stations to customers.

In physics and electrical engineering, an electrical conductor is an object or type of material that readily allows the flow of charge ( electric current) in one or more directions. The flow of charge happens via charge carriers, the type(s) of which are specific to the conductor material. In metals, which are commonly electrical conductors, the charge carriers are negatively charged electrons. Examples of charge carriers in other types of materials are positively charged holes and positively or negatively charged ions.

The flow of charge in a conductor usually occurs in response to an electric field that is established within that conductor. The electric field exerts electric force on the charge carriers, which causes net movement. In conventional electrical circuits, the electric field which causes conduction is usually established by applying a potential difference (voltage).

Conductors have various material properties that affect or describe their ability to conduct current, including resistivity and conductivity. These intrinsic material properties along with factors such as geometry and temperature determine a material's resistance and conductance. There are three main categories that describe a material's conductive characteristics: insulator, semiconductor, and conductor. The opposite of a conductor is an insulator, which resists the flow of charge. A semiconductor falls in between insulators and conductors in terms of capability to allow current, and their conductivity depends significantly on factors such as temperature, atomic makeup, and applied electric field.

Electrical conductors are critical to the function of modern day life, and they play a primary role in applications such as power transmission and distribution, electrical wiring, and electronic devices. Copper and aluminium are two of the most commonly used conductors due to their high conductivity and relatively low cost.

== Mechanisms of Conduction ==
==== Charge Carriers ====
While electrons are the primary charge carrier in metals, other devices such as the cationic electrolyte(s) of a battery or the mobile protons of the proton conductor of a fuel cell rely on positive charge carriers. Semiconductors typically have both positively-charged holes and negatively-charged electrons as charge carriers, and which carrier is primary depends on the specific type of semiconductor.

==== Models of Conduction ====
In order for current to flow within a closed electrical circuit, one charged particle does not need to travel from the component producing the current (the current source) to those consuming it (the loads). Instead, the charged particle simply needs to nudge its neighbor a finite amount, who will nudge its neighbor, and on and on until a particle is nudged into the consumer, thus powering it. Essentially what is occurring is a long chain of momentum transfer between mobile charge carriers; the Drude model of conduction describes this process more rigorously. This momentum transfer model makes metal an ideal choice for a conductor; metals, characteristically, possess a delocalized sea of electrons which gives the electrons enough mobility to collide and thus affect a momentum transfer.

== Resistance and conductance ==
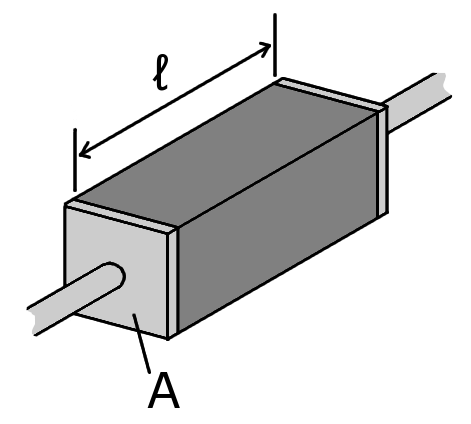
A piece of resistive material with electrical contacts on both ends

The resistance of a given conductor depends on the material it is made of, and on its dimensions. For a given material, the resistance is inversely proportional to the cross-sectional area. For example, a thick copper wire has lower resistance than an otherwise-identical thin copper wire. Also, for a given material, the resistance is proportional to the length; for example, a long copper wire has higher resistance than an otherwise-identical short copper wire. The resistance R and conductance G of a conductor of uniform cross section, therefore, can be computed as

$$\begin{align}
R & = \rho \frac \ell A, \\[6pt]
G & = \sigma \frac A \ell.
\end{align}$$

where $\ell$ is the length of the conductor, measured in metres [m], A is the cross-section area of the conductor measured in square metres [m^{2}], σ (sigma) is the electrical conductivity measured in siemens per meter (S·m^{−1}), and ρ (rho) is the electrical resistivity (also called specific electrical resistance) of the material, measured in ohm-metres (Ω·m). The resistivity and conductivity are proportionality constants, and therefore depend only on the material the wire is made of, not the geometry of the wire. Resistivity and conductivity are reciprocals: $\rho=1/\sigma$. Resistivity is a measure of the material's ability to oppose electric current.

This formula assumes the current density is uniform in the conductor. This is not always the case in practical situations, such as alternating current skin effect. However, this formula still provides a good approximation for long thin conductors such as wires.

Another situation this formula is not exact for is with alternating current (AC), because the skin effect inhibits current flow near the center of the conductor. Then, the geometrical cross-section is different from the effective cross-section in which current actually flows, so the resistance is higher than expected. Similarly, if two conductors are near each other carrying AC current, their resistances increase due to the proximity effect. At commercial power frequency, these effects are significant for large conductors carrying large currents, such as busbars in an electrical substation, or large power cables carrying more than a few hundred amperes.

Aside from the geometry of the wire, temperature also has a significant effect on the efficacy of conductors. Temperature affects conductors in two main ways, the first is that materials may expand under the application of heat. The amount that the material will expand is governed by the thermal expansion coefficient specific to the material. Such an expansion (or contraction) will change the geometry of the conductor and therefore its characteristic resistance. However, this effect is generally small, on the order of 10^{−6}. An increase in temperature will also increase the number of phonons generated within the material. A phonon is essentially a lattice vibration, or rather a small, harmonic kinetic movement of the atoms of the material. Much like the shaking of a pinball machine, phonons serve to disrupt the path of electrons, causing them to scatter. This electron scattering will decrease the number of electron collisions and therefore will decrease the total amount of current transferred.

Material	ρ [Ω·m] at 20 °C	σ [S/m] at 20 °C
Silver, Ag	1.59 × 10^{−8}	6.30 × 10^{7}
Copper, Cu	1.68 × 10^{−8}	5.96 × 10^{7}
Aluminum, Al	2.82 × 10^{−8}	3.50 × 10^{7}

Conduction materials include metals, electrolytes, superconductors, semiconductors, plasmas and some nonmetallic conductors such as graphite and conductive polymers.

Copper has a high conductivity. Annealed copper is the international standard to which all other electrical conductors are compared; the International Annealed Copper Standard (IACS) conductivity is 58 MS/m, although ultra-pure copper can slightly exceed 101% IACS. The main grade of copper used for electrical applications, such as building wire, motor windings, cables and busbars, is electrolytic-tough pitch (ETP) copper (CW004A or ASTM designation C100140). If high conductivity copper must be welded or brazed or used in a reducing atmosphere, then oxygen-free high conductivity copper (CW008A or ASTM designation C10100) may be used. Because of its ease of connection by soldering or clamping, copper is still the most common choice for most light-gauge wires. This is why copper is used mostly, because it is affordable and a good conductor.

Silver is 6% more conductive than copper, but due to cost it is not practical in most cases. However, it is used in specialized equipment, such as satellites, and as a thin plating to mitigate skin effect losses at high frequencies. Famously, 14,700 short tons (13,300 t) of silver on loan from the United States Treasury were used in the making of the calutron magnets during World War II due to wartime shortages of copper.

Aluminum wire is the most common metal in electric power transmission and distribution. Although only 61% of the conductivity of copper by cross-sectional area, its lower density makes it twice as conductive by mass. As aluminum is roughly one-third the cost of copper by weight, the economic advantages are considerable when large conductors are required.

The disadvantages of aluminum wiring lie in its mechanical and chemical properties. It readily forms an insulating oxide, making connections heat up. Its larger coefficient of thermal expansion than the brass materials used for connectors causes connections to loosen. Aluminum can also "creep", slowly deforming under load, which also loosens connections. These effects can be mitigated with suitably designed connectors and extra care in installation, but they have made aluminum building wiring unpopular past the service drop.

Very few organic compounds conduct electricity. For example, hydrocarbon oils, such as octane, are a common transformer insulator. Typical organic compounds do not conduct because they lack charge carriers. They are uncharged molecules, unable to perform ionic conduction; and their electrons are imperturbable at low energy, localized to relatively inert covalent bonds. Rare organic conductors arise from a failure of either condition: certain ionic liquids conduct through ion transport and conductive polymers delocalize a substantial portion of their electrons in a π system.

While pure water is not an electrical conductor, even a small portion of ionic impurities, such as salt, can rapidly transform it into a conductor.

== Wire size ==
Wires are measured by their cross sectional area. In many countries, the size is expressed in square millimetres. In North America, conductors are measured by American wire gauge for smaller ones, and circular mils for larger ones.

== Conductor ampacity ==
The ampacity of a conductor, that is, the amount of current it can carry, is related to its electrical resistance: a lower-resistance conductor can carry a larger value of current. The resistance, in turn, is determined by the material the conductor is made from (as described above) and the conductor's size. For a given material, conductors with a larger cross-sectional area have less resistance than conductors with a smaller cross-sectional area.

For bare conductors, the ultimate limit is the point at which power lost to resistance causes the conductor to melt. Aside from fuses, most conductors in the real world are operated far below this limit, however. For example, household wiring is usually insulated with PVC insulation that is only rated to operate to about 60 °C, therefore, the current in such wires must be limited so that it never heats the copper conductor above 60 °C, causing a risk of fire. Other, more expensive insulation such as Teflon or fiberglass may allow operation at much higher temperatures.

== Isotropy ==
If an electric field is applied to a material, and the resulting induced electric current is in the same direction, the material is said to be an isotropic electrical conductor. If the resulting electric current is in a different direction from the applied electric field, the material is said to be an anisotropic electrical conductor.

== See also ==
- Lightning rod

Classification of materials based on permittivity
ε_{r}″/ε_{r}′	Current conduction	Field propagation
0		perfect dielectric lossless medium
$\ll 1$	low-conductivity material poor conductor	low-loss medium good dielectric
$\approx 1$	lossy conducting material	lossy propagation medium
$\gg 1$	high-conductivity material good conductor	high-loss medium poor dielectric
$\infty$	perfect conductor	

- Bundle conductor
- Charge transfer complex
- Electrical cable
- Electrical resistivity and conductivity
- Fourth rail
- Overhead line
- Stephen Gray, first to identify electrical conductors and insulators
- Superconductivity
- Third rail
