= Single crystal =

Material with a continuous, unbroken crystal lattice

Crystallization

Fundamentals
- Crystal; Crystal structure; Nucleation

Concepts
- Crystallization; Crystal growth; Recrystallization; Seed crystal; Protocrystalline; Single crystal

Methods and technology
- Boules; Bridgman–Stockbarger method; Van Arkel–de Boer process; Czochralski method; Epitaxy; Flux method; Fractional crystallization; Fractional freezing; Hydrothermal synthesis; Kyropoulos method; Laser-heated pedestal growth; Lely method; Micro-pulling-down; Shaping processes in crystal growth; Skull crucible; Verneuil method; Zone melting

In materials science, a single crystal (or single-crystal solid or monocrystalline solid) is a material in which the crystal lattice of the entire sample is continuous and unbroken to the edges of the sample, with no grain boundaries. The absence of the defects associated with grain boundaries can give monocrystals unique properties, particularly mechanical, optical and electrical, which can also be anisotropic, depending on the type of crystallographic structure. These properties, in addition to making some gems precious, are industrially used in technological applications, especially in optics and electronics.

Because entropic effects favor the presence of some imperfections in the microstructure of solids, such as impurities, inhomogeneous strain and crystallographic defects such as dislocations, perfect single crystals of meaningful size are exceedingly rare in nature. The necessary laboratory conditions often add to the cost of production. On the other hand, imperfect single crystals can reach enormous sizes in nature: several mineral species such as beryl, gypsum and feldspars are known to have produced crystals several meters across.

The opposite of a single crystal is an amorphous structure where the atomic position is limited to short-range order only. In between the two extremes exist polycrystalline, which is made up of a number of smaller crystals known as crystallites, and paracrystalline phases. Single crystals will usually have distinctive plane faces and some symmetry, where the angles between the faces will dictate its ideal shape. Gemstones are often single crystals artificially cut along crystallographic planes to take advantage of refractive and reflective properties.

== Production methods ==
Although current methods are extremely sophisticated with modern technology, the origins of crystal growth can be traced back to salt purification by crystallization in 2500 BCE. A more advanced method using an aqueous solution was started in 1600 CE while the melt and vapor methods began around 1850 CE.

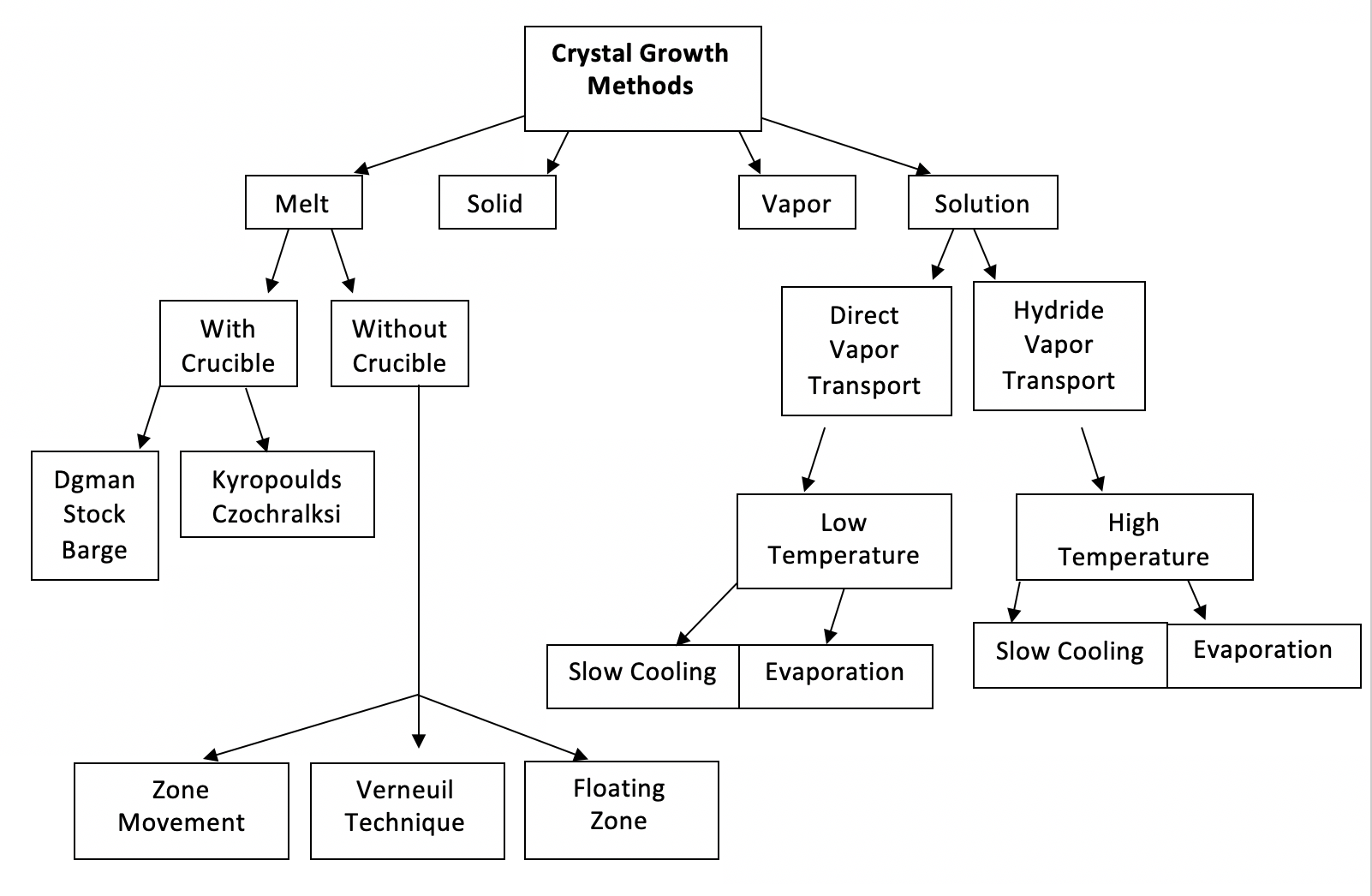
Single-crystal growth methods tree diagram

Basic crystal growth methods can be separated into four categories based on what they are artificially grown from: melt, solid, vapor, and solution. Specific techniques to produce large single crystals (aka boules) include the Czochralski process (CZ), floating zone (or zone movement), and the Bridgman technique. Dr. Teal and Dr. Little of Bell Telephone Laboratories were the first to use the Czochralski method to create Ge and Si single crystals. Other methods of crystallization may be used, depending on the physical properties of the substance, including hydrothermal synthesis, sublimation, or simply solvent-based crystallization. For example, a modified Kyropoulos method can be used to grow high quality 300 kg sapphire single crystals. The Verneuil method, also called the flame-fusion method, was used in the early 1900s to make rubies before CZ. The diagram on the right illustrates most of the conventional methods. There have been new breakthroughs such as chemical vapor depositions (CVD) along with different variations and tweaks to the existing methods. These are not shown in the diagram.

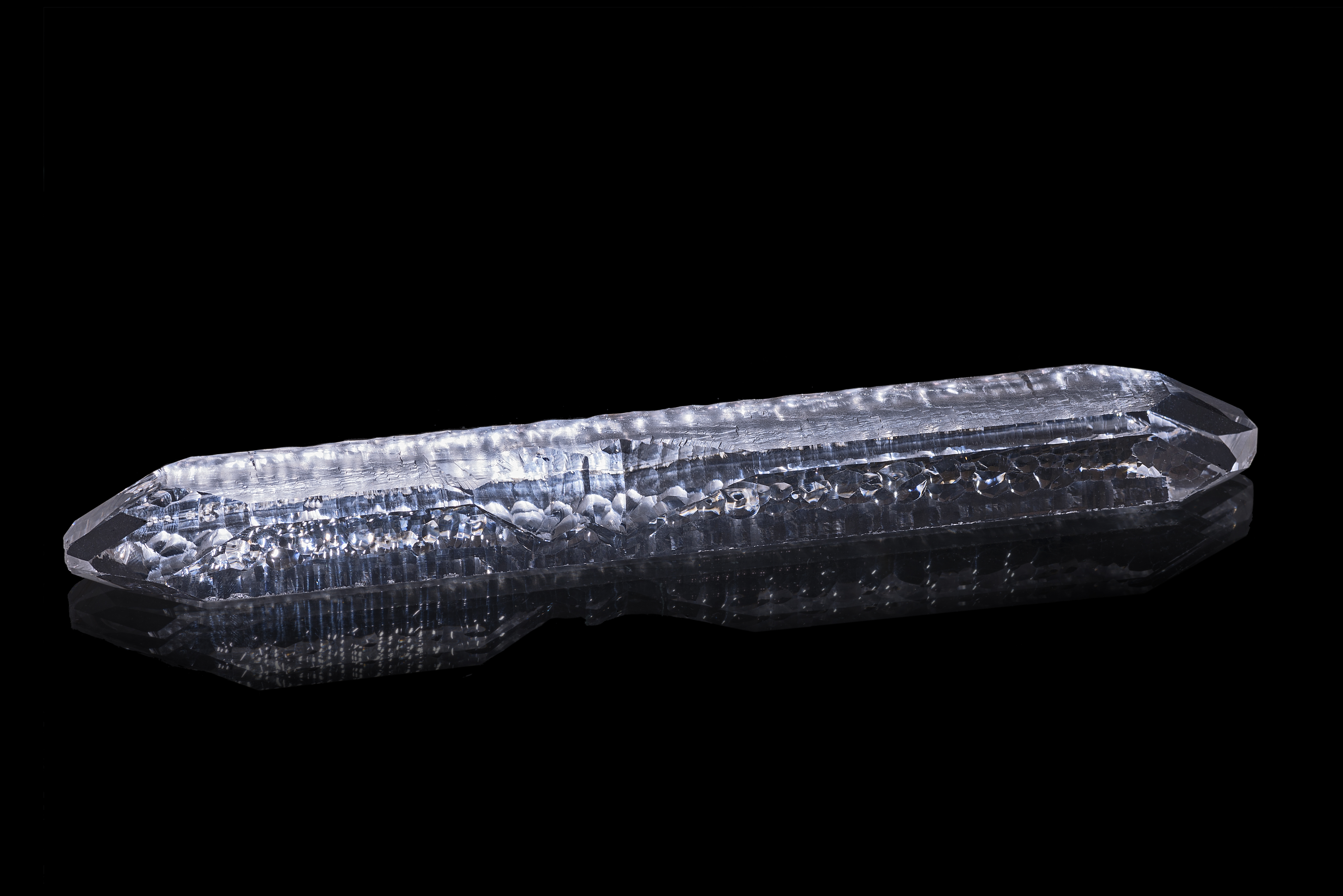
A single-crystal quartz bar grown by the hydrothermal method

In the case of metal single crystals, fabrication techniques also include epitaxy and abnormal grain growth in solids. Epitaxy is used to deposit very thin (micrometer to nanometer scale) layers of the same or different materials on the surface of an existing single crystal. Applications of this technique lie in the areas of semiconductor production, with potential uses in other nanotechnological fields and catalysis.

It is extremely difficult to grow single crystals of the polymers. It is mainly because that the polymer chains are of different length and due to the various entropy reasons. However, topochemical reactions are one of the easy methods to get single crystals of the polymer.

== Applications ==
=== Semiconductor industry ===
One of the most used single crystals is that of silicon in the semiconductor industry. The four main production methods for semiconductor single crystals are from metallic solutions: liquid phase epitaxy (LPE), liquid phase electroepitaxy (LPEE), the traveling heater method (THM), and liquid phase diffusion (LPD). However, there are many other single crystals besides inorganic single crystals capable semiconducting, including single-crystal organic semiconductors.

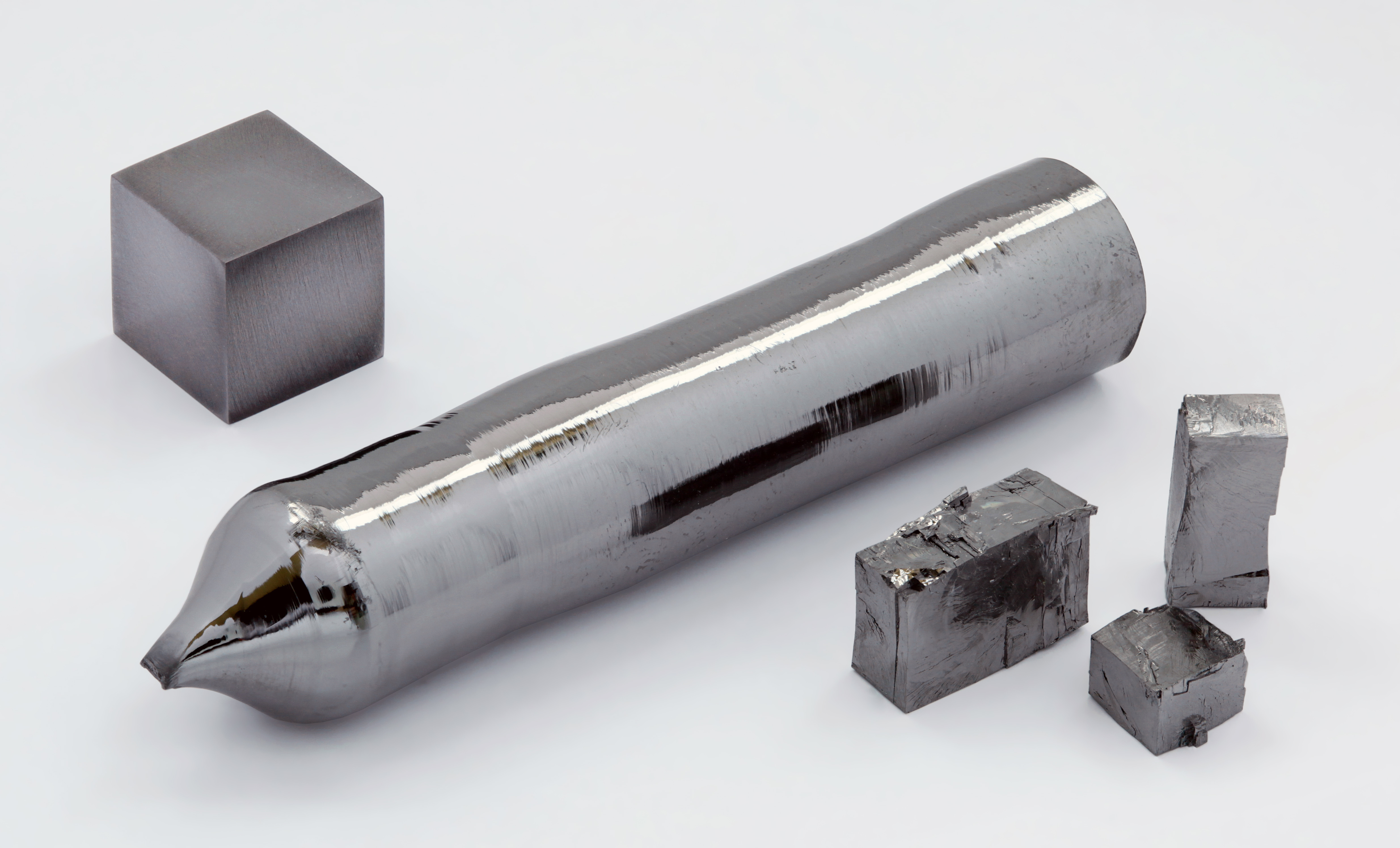
A high-purity (99.999 %) tantalum single crystal, made by the floating zone process, some single crystalline fragments of tantalum, and a high-purity (99.99% = 4N) 1 cm^{3} tantalum cube for comparison.

Monocrystalline silicon used in the fabrication of semiconductors and photovoltaics is the greatest use of single-crystal technology today. In photovoltaics, the most efficient crystal structure will yield the highest light-to-electricity conversion. On the quantum scale that microprocessors operate on, the presence of grain boundaries would have a significant impact on the functionality of field effect transistors by altering local electrical properties. Therefore, microprocessor fabricators have invested heavily in facilities to produce large single crystals of silicon. The Czochralski method and floating zone are popular methods for the growth of silicon crystals.

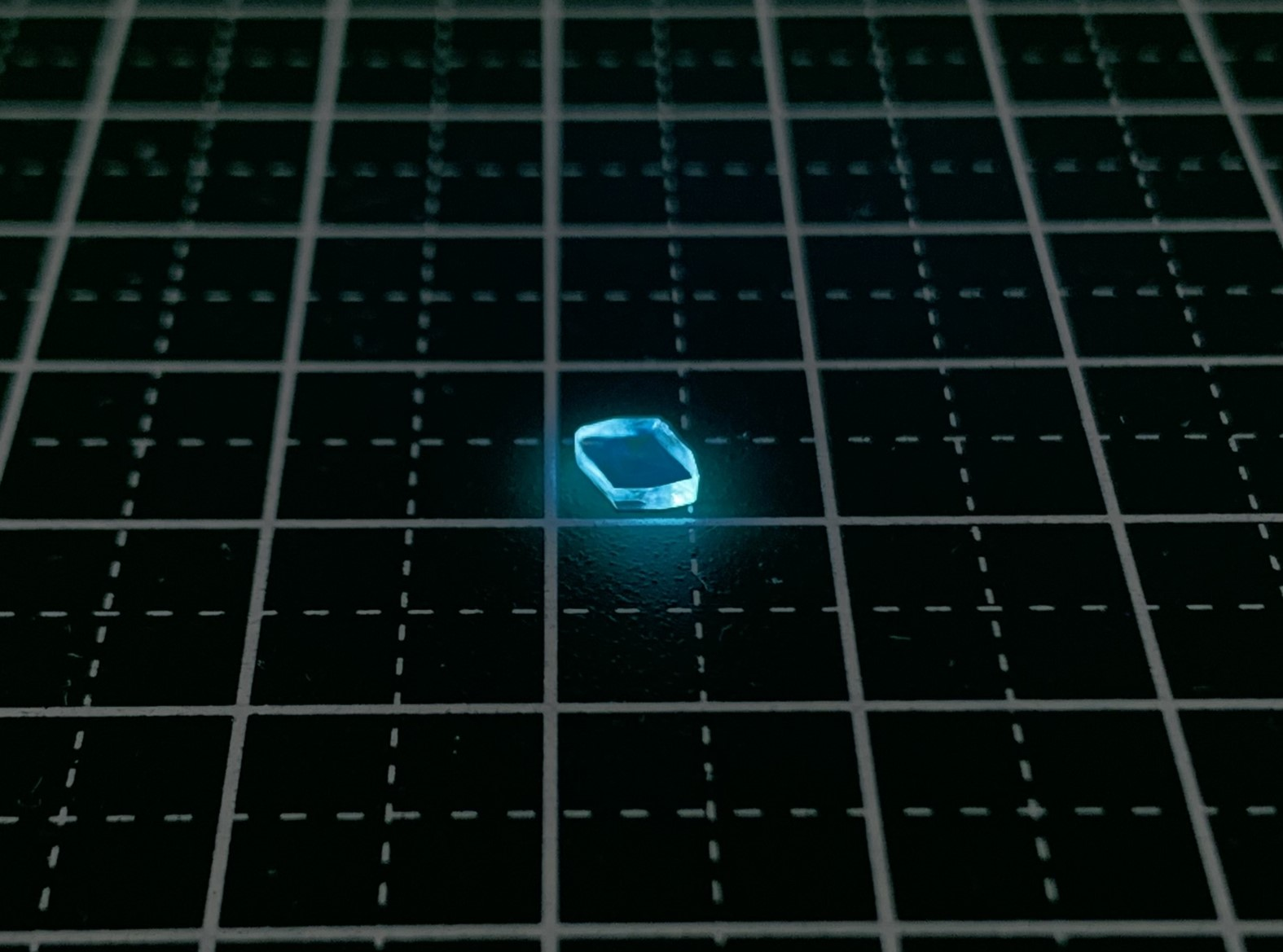
Fluorescence of (9H-carbazol-9-yl)(4-chlorophenyl)methanone single crystal.

Other inorganic semiconducting single crystals include GaAs, GaP, GaSb, Ge, InAs, InP, InSb, CdS, CdSe, CdTe, ZnS, ZnSe, and ZnTe. Most of these can also be tuned with various doping for desired properties. Single-crystal graphene is also highly desired for applications in electronics and optoelectronics with its large carrier mobility and high thermal conductivity, and remains a topic of fervent research. One of the main challenges has been growing uniform single crystals of bilayer or multilayer graphene over large areas; epitaxial growth and the new CVD (mentioned above) are among the new methods under investigation.

Organic semiconducting single crystals are different from the inorganic crystals. The weak intermolecular bonds mean lower melting temperatures, and higher vapor pressures and greater solubility. For single crystals to grow, the purity of the material is crucial and the production of organic materials usually require many steps to reach the necessary purity. Extensive research is being done to look for materials that are thermally stable with high charge-carrier mobility. Past discoveries include naphthalene, tetracene, and 9,10-diphenylanthacene (DPA). Triphenylamine derivatives have shown promise, and recently in 2021, the single-crystal structure of α-phenyl-4′-(diphenylamino)stilbene (TPA) grown using the solution method exhibited even greater potential for semiconductor use with its anisotropic hole transport property.

=== Optical application ===
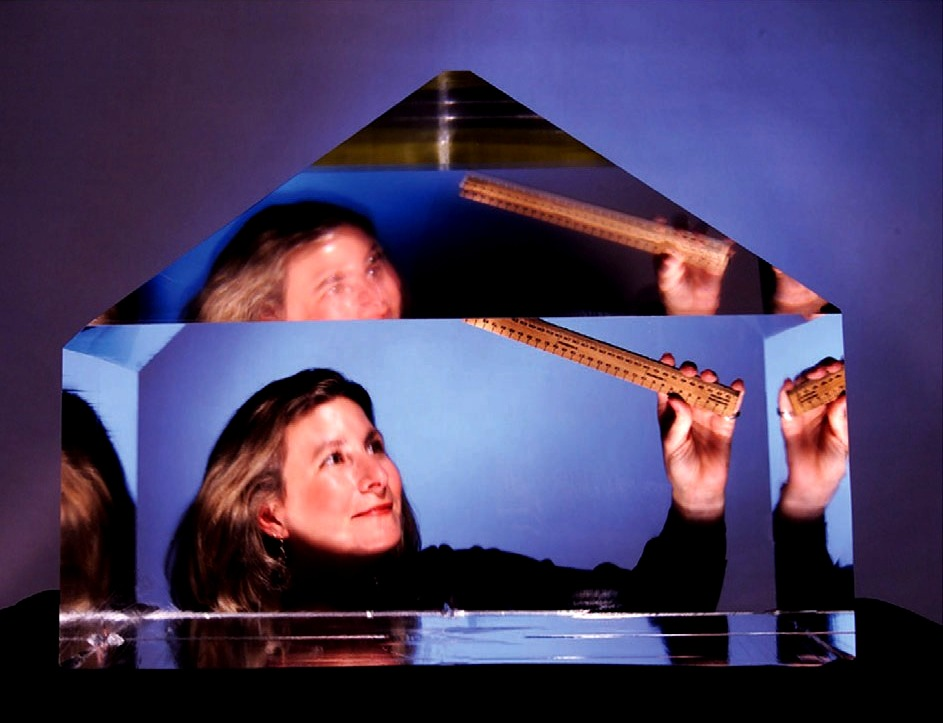
A huge KDP, potassium dihydrogen phosphate, crystal grown from a seed crystal in a supersaturated aqueous solution at LLNL which is to be cut into slices and used on the National Ignition Facility for frequency doubling and tripling.

Single crystals have unique physical properties due to being a single grain with molecules in a strict order and no grain boundaries. This includes optical properties, and single crystals of silicon are also used as optical windows because of its transparency at specific infrared (IR) wavelengths, making it very useful for some instruments.

Sapphires: also known as the alpha phase of aluminium oxide (Al_{2}O_{3}) to scientists, sapphire single crystals are widely used in hi-tech engineering. It can be grown from gaseous, solid, or solution phases. The diameter of the crystals resulting from the growth method are important when considering electronic uses after. They are used for lasers and nonlinear optics. Some notable uses are as in the window of a biometric fingerprint reader, optical disks for long-term data storage, and X-ray interferometer.

Indium phosphide: these single crystals are particularly appropriate for combining optoelectronics with high-speed electronics in the form of optical fiber with its large-diameter substrates. Other photonic devices include lasers, photodetectors, avalanche photo diodes, optical modulators and amplifiers, signal processing, and both optoelectronic and photonic integrated circuits.

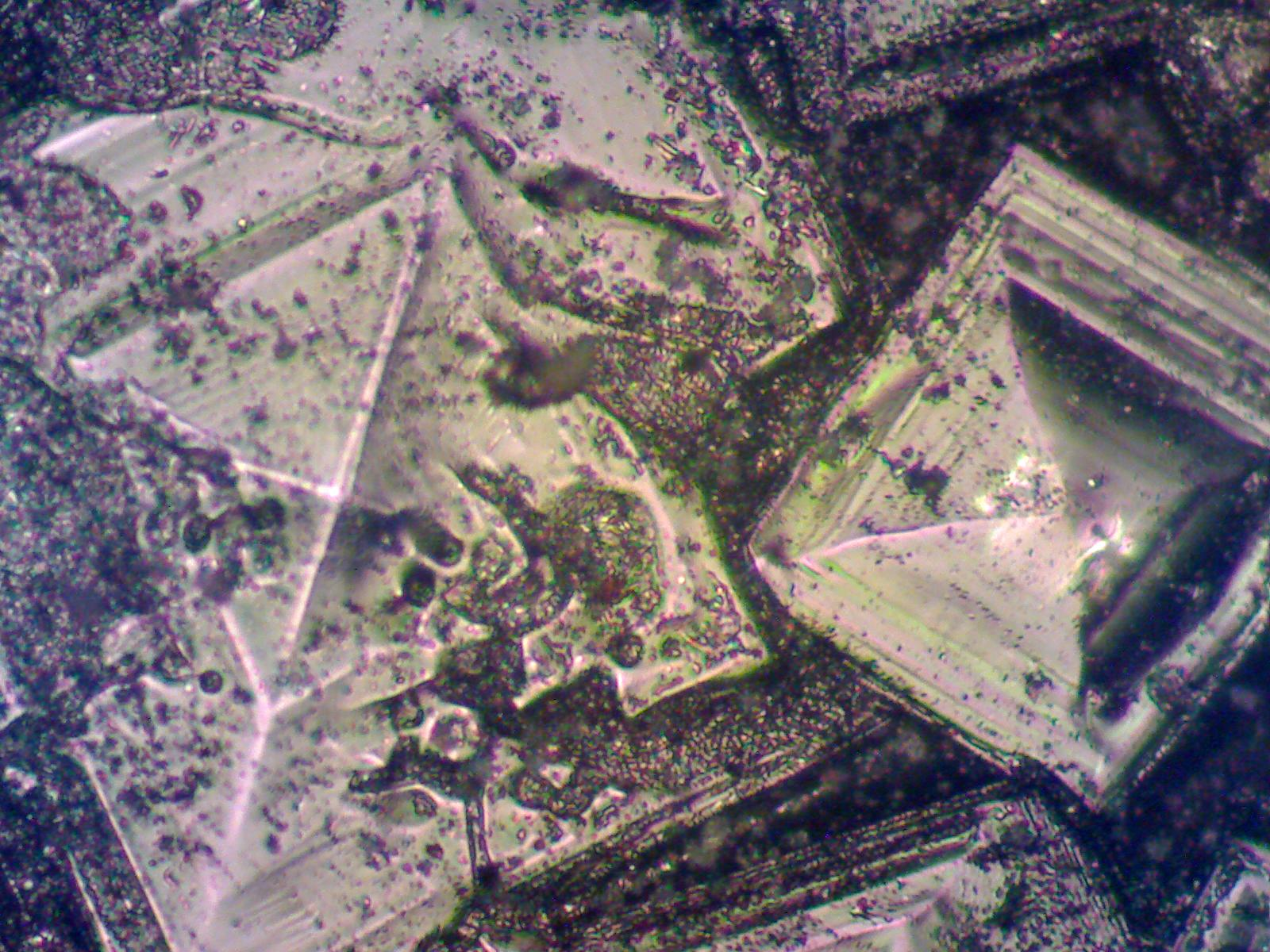
Aluminium oxide crystals

Germanium: this was the material in the first transistor invented by Bardeen, Brattain, and Shockley in 1947. It is used in some gamma-ray detectors and infrared optics. Now it has become the focus of ultrafast electronic devices for its intrinsic carrier mobility.

Arsenide: arsenide III can be combined with various elements such as B, Al, Ga, and In, with the GaAs compound being in high demand for wafers.

Cadmium telluride: CdTe crystals have several applications as substrates for IR imaging, electrooptic devices, and solar cells. By alloying CdTe and ZnTe together room-temperature X-ray and gamma-ray detectors can be made.

=== Electrical conductors ===
Metals can be produced in single-crystal form and provide a means to understand the ultimate performance of metallic conductors. It is vital for understanding the basic science such as catalytic chemistry, surface physics, electrons, and monochromators. Production of metallic single crystals have the highest quality requirements and are grown, or pulled, in the form of rods. Certain companies can produce specific geometries, grooves, holes, and reference faces along with varying diameters.

Of all the metallic elements, silver and copper have the best conductivity at room temperature, which is generally the bar for performance. The size of the market, and vagaries in supply and cost, have provided strong incentives to seek alternatives or find ways to use less of them by improving performance.

The conductivity of commercial conductors is often expressed relative to the International Annealed Copper Standard, according to which the purest copper wire available in 1914 measured around 100%. The purest modern copper wire is a better conductor, measuring over 103% on this scale. The gains are from two sources. First, modern copper is more pure. However, this avenue for improvement seems at an end. Making the copper purer still makes no significant improvement. Second, annealing and other processes have been improved. Annealing reduces the dislocations and other crystal defects which are sources of resistance. But the resulting wires are still polycrystalline. The grain boundaries and remaining crystal defects are responsible for some residual resistance. This can be quantified and better understood by examining single crystals.

Single-crystal copper did prove to have better conductivity than polycrystalline copper.

Electrical resistivity ρ for silver (Ag) / copper (Cu) materials at room temperature (293 K)
Material	ρ (μΩ∙cm)	IACS
Single-crystal Ag, doped with 3 mol% Cu	1.35	127%
Single-crystal Cu, further processed	1.472	117.1%
Single-crystal Ag	1.49	115.4%
Single-crystal Cu	1.52	113.4%
High-purity Ag wire (polycrystalline)	1.59	108%
High-purity Cu wire (polycrystalline)	1.67	˃ 103%

However, the single-crystal copper not only became a better conductor than high purity polycrystalline silver, but with prescribed heat and pressure treatment could surpass even single-crystal silver. Although impurities are usually bad for conductivity, a silver single crystal with a small amount of copper substitutions proved to be the best.

As of 2009, no single-crystal copper is manufactured on a large scale industrially, but methods of producing very large individual crystal sizes for copper conductors are exploited for high performance electrical applications. These can be considered meta-single crystals with only a few crystals per meter of length.

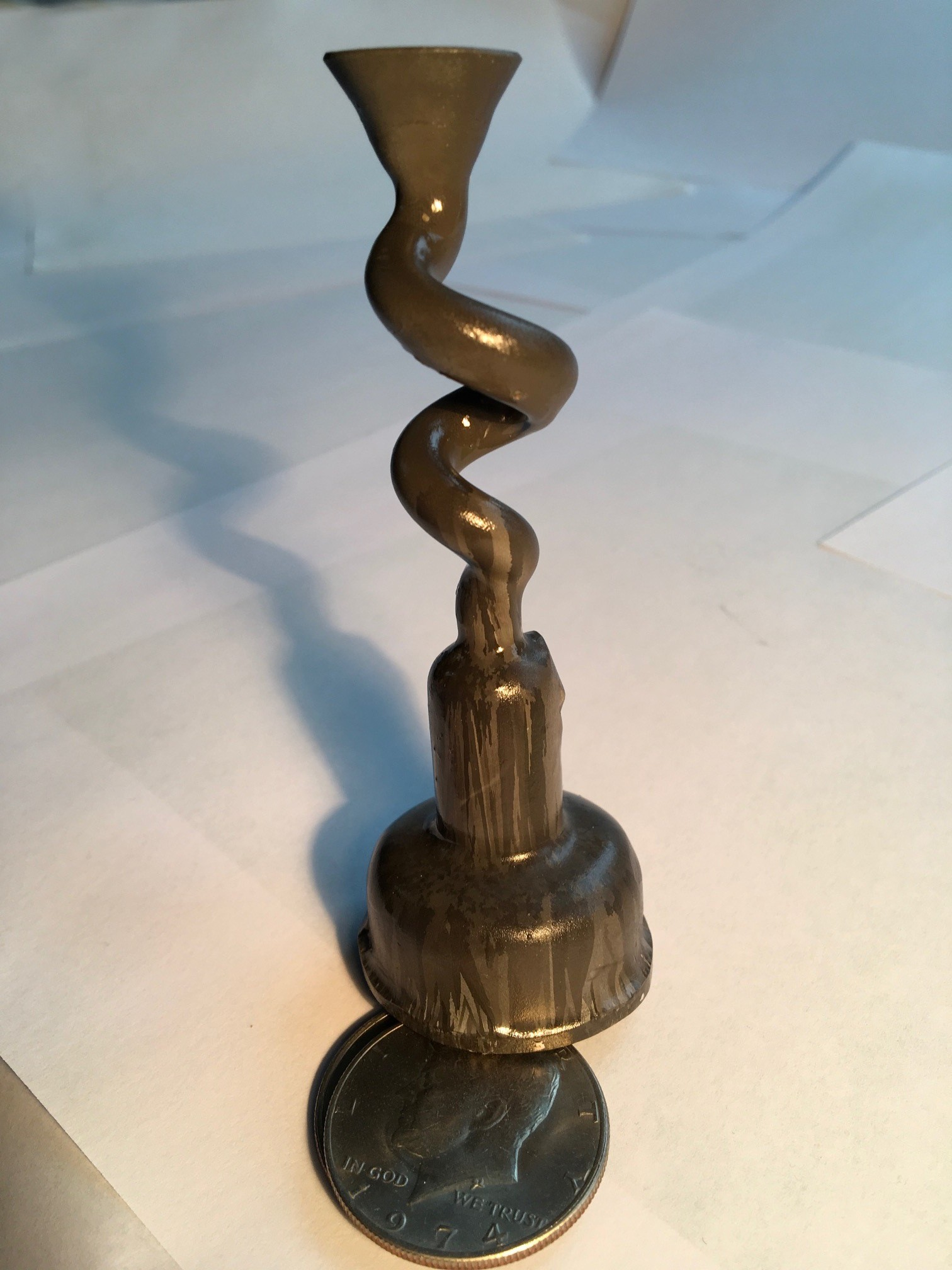
Pigtail from single-crystal blade casting

=== Single-crystal turbine blades ===
Whilst the absence of grain boundaries decreases yield strength, this is offset by a reduction in thermal creep, making single-crystal solids ideal for high temperature, close tolerance part applications, such as turbine blades. Researcher Barry Piearcey found that a right-angle bend at the casting mold would decrease the number of columnar crystals and later, Pratt & Whitney scientist, Tony Giamei, used this to start the blade's single-crystal structure.

== In research ==
Single crystals are essential in research especially condensed-matter physics and all aspects of materials science such as surface science. The detailed study of the crystal structure of a material by techniques such as Bragg diffraction and helium atom scattering is easier with single crystals because it is possible to study directional dependence of various properties and compare with theoretical predictions. Furthermore, macroscopically averaging techniques such as angle-resolved photoemission spectroscopy or low-energy electron diffraction are only possible or meaningful on surfaces of single crystals. Single crystals are further well-suited to investigate material-inherent properties using surface-sensitive techniques, as they are much less affected by preparation methods than thin films. In superconductivity there have been cases of materials where superconductivity is only seen in single-crystalline specimen. They may be grown for this purpose, even when the material is otherwise only needed in polycrystalline form.

As such, numerous new materials are being studied in their single-crystal form. The young field of metal-organic-frameworks (MOFs) is one of many which qualify to have single crystals. In January 2021 Dr. Dong and Dr. Feng demonstrated how polycyclic aromatic ligands can be optimized to produce large 2D MOF single crystals of sizes up to 200 μm. This could mean scientists can fabricate single-crystal devices and determine intrinsic electrical conductivity and charge transport mechanism.

The field of photodriven transformation can also be involved with single crystals with something called single-crystal-to-single-crystal (SCSC) transformations. These provide direct observation of molecular movement and understanding of mechanistic details. This photoswitching behavior has also been observed in cutting-edge research on intrinsically non-photo-responsive mononuclear lanthanide single-molecule-magnets (SMM).

== Post-processing of single crystals ==
Single crystals used in semiconductors, optics, and ceramics must often be machined or sliced into wafers, prisms, or other precision components. Due to their hardness and brittleness, these materials require specialized cutting techniques that minimize subsurface damage and kerf loss.

Inner diameter (ID) sawing is a conventional method, where a thin circular blade embedded with diamond abrasives slices through the crystal. It provides good dimensional accuracy but is limited by blade rigidity and maximum cutting depth.

Multi-wire sawing, which uses long diamond wires moving reciprocally, became the mainstream process for silicon and sapphire wafers. It allows simultaneous slicing of multiple wafers from a single ingot, but the back-and-forth motion can cause vibration and wire wear, leading to surface marks and variable tension.

Endless diamond wire sawing (loop-type) is a more recent approach. The wire forms a continuous closed loop, typically several meters in length, running in a single direction at high linear speeds (around 60–80 m/s). Because the wire tension and motion are steady, the process can achieve smoother surfaces, smaller kerf widths, and longer tool life. It has been applied to slicing hard and brittle single-crystal materials such as silicon, sapphire, and advanced ceramics.

Other techniques, including laser slicing, ultrasonic machining, and ion-beam or chemical-mechanical polishing, are used for finishing or micro-fabrication stages, especially when optical-grade surface quality is required.

== See also ==
- Engineering aspects of crystallisation
- Fractional crystallization
- Laser-heated pedestal growth
- Micro-pulling-down
- Recrystallization
- Seed crystal
