= Oxygen-free copper =

Pure copper without oxygen in its crystal lattice

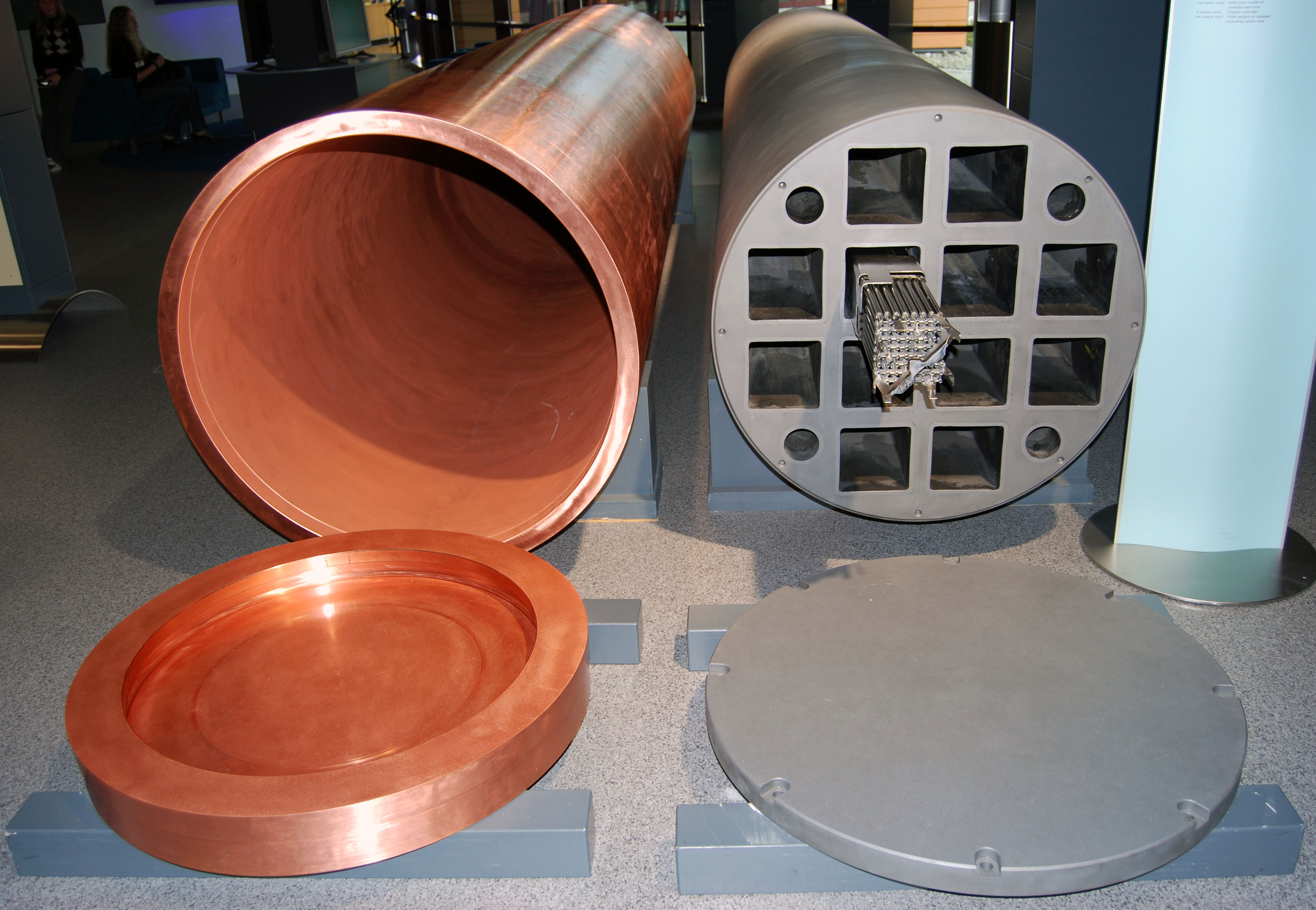
The CuOFP capsule used as overpack for spent nuclear fuel disposal in the KBS-3 concept (Swedish version)

Oxygen-free copper (OFC) or oxygen-free high thermal conductivity (OFHC) copper is a group of wrought high-conductivity copper alloys that have been electrolytically refined to reduce the level of oxygen to 0.001% or below. Oxygen-free copper is a premium grade of copper that has a high level of conductivity and is virtually free from oxygen content. The oxygen content of copper affects its electrical properties and can reduce conductivity.

== Specification ==
Oxygen-free copper is typically specified according to the ASTM/UNS database. The UNS database includes many different compositions of high conductivity electrical copper. Of these, three are widely used and two are considered oxygen-free:

- C10100 – also known as oxygen-free electronic (OFE). This is a 99.99% pure copper with 0.0005% oxygen content. It achieves a minimum 101% IACS conductivity rating. This copper is finished to a final form in a carefully regulated, oxygen-free environment. Silver (Ag) is considered an impurity in the OFE chemical specification. This is also the most expensive of the three grades listed here.
- C10200 – also known as oxygen-free (OF). While OF is considered oxygen-free, its conductivity rating is no better than the more common ETP grade below. It has a 0.001% oxygen content, 99.95% purity and minimum 100% IACS conductivity. For the purposes of purity percentage, silver (Ag) content is counted as copper (Cu).
- C11000 – also known as electrolytic-tough-pitch (ETP). This is the most common copper. It is ubiquitous in electrical applications. ETP has a minimum conductivity rating of 100% IACS and is required to be 99.9% pure. It has 0.02% to 0.04% oxygen content (typical). Most ETP sold today meets or exceeds the 101% IACS specification. As with OF copper, silver (Ag) content is counted as copper (Cu) for purity purposes.

=== Oxygen-free high thermal conductivity ===
Oxygen-free high thermal conductivity (OFHC) copper is widely used in cryogenics. OFHC is produced by the direct conversion of selected refined cathodes and castings under carefully controlled conditions to prevent contamination of the pure oxygen-free metal during processing. The method of producing OFHC copper ensures an extra high grade of metal with a copper content of 99.99%. With so small a content of extraneous elements, the inherent properties of elemental copper are brought forth to a high degree. In practice the oxygen content is typically 0.001 to 0.003% with a total maximum impurity level of 0.03%. These characteristics are high ductility, high electrical and thermal conductivity, high impact strength, good creep resistance, ease of welding, and low relative volatility under ultra-high vacuum.

== Standards ==
Conductivity is generally specified relative to the 1913 International Annealed Copper Standard of 5.8×10^{7} S/m. Advances in the refining process now yield OF and ETP copper that can meet or exceed 101% of this standard. (Ultra-pure copper has a conductivity of 5.865×10^{7} S/m, 102.75% IACS.) Note that OF and ETP coppers have identical conductivity requirements.

Oxygen plays a beneficial role for improving copper conductivity. During the copper smelting process, oxygen is deliberately injected into the melt to scavenge impurities that would otherwise degrade conductivity.

There are advanced refining processes such as the Czochralski process than can achieve impurity levels below the C10100 specification by reducing copper grain density. At this time, there are currently no UNS/ASTM classifications for these specialty coppers and the IACS conductivity of these coppers is not readily available.

== Industrial applications ==
For industrial applications, oxygen-free copper is valued more for its chemical purity than its electrical conductivity. OF/OFE-grade copper is used in plasma deposition (sputtering) processes, including the manufacture of semiconductors and superconductor components, as well as in other ultra-high vacuum devices such as particle accelerators. In any of these applications, the release of oxygen or other impurities can cause undesirable chemical reactions with other materials in the local environment.

== Use in home audio ==
The high-end speaker wire industry markets oxygen-free copper as having enhanced conductivity or other electrical properties that are supposedly advantageous to audio signal transmission. In fact, conductivity specifications for common C11000 (ETP) and higher-cost C10200 oxygen-free (OF) coppers are identical; and even the much more expensive C10100 has only a one-percent higher conductivity—insignificant in audio applications.

OFC is nevertheless sold for both audio and video signals in audio playback systems and home cinema.

== Oxygen-free phosphorus-containing copper ==
High-electrical-conductivity coppers are distinct from coppers deoxidized by the addition of phosphorus in the smelting process. Oxygen-free phosphorus-containing copper (CuOFP) is typically used for structural and thermal applications where the copper material will be subject to temperatures high enough to cause hydrogen embrittlement or more exactly steam embrittlement. Examples include welding/brazing rods and heat exchanger tubing.

Copper alloys containing oxygen as an impurity (in the form of residual oxides present in the metal matrix) can be embrittled if exposed to hot hydrogen. The hydrogen diffuses through the copper and reacts with inclusions of Cu_{2}O, forming H_{2}O, which then forms pressurized water steam bubbles at the grain boundaries. This process can cause the grains to be forced away from each other and is known as steam embrittlement (because the problem is caused through production of steam, not exposure to it).

CuOFP has been selected as corrosion-resistant material for the overpack of spent nuclear fuel in the KBS-3 concept developed in Sweden and Finland to dispose of high-level radioactive waste in crystalline rock formations.

== See also ==
- Copper wire and cable
