= Float-zone silicon =

Very pure silicon obtained by vertical zone melting

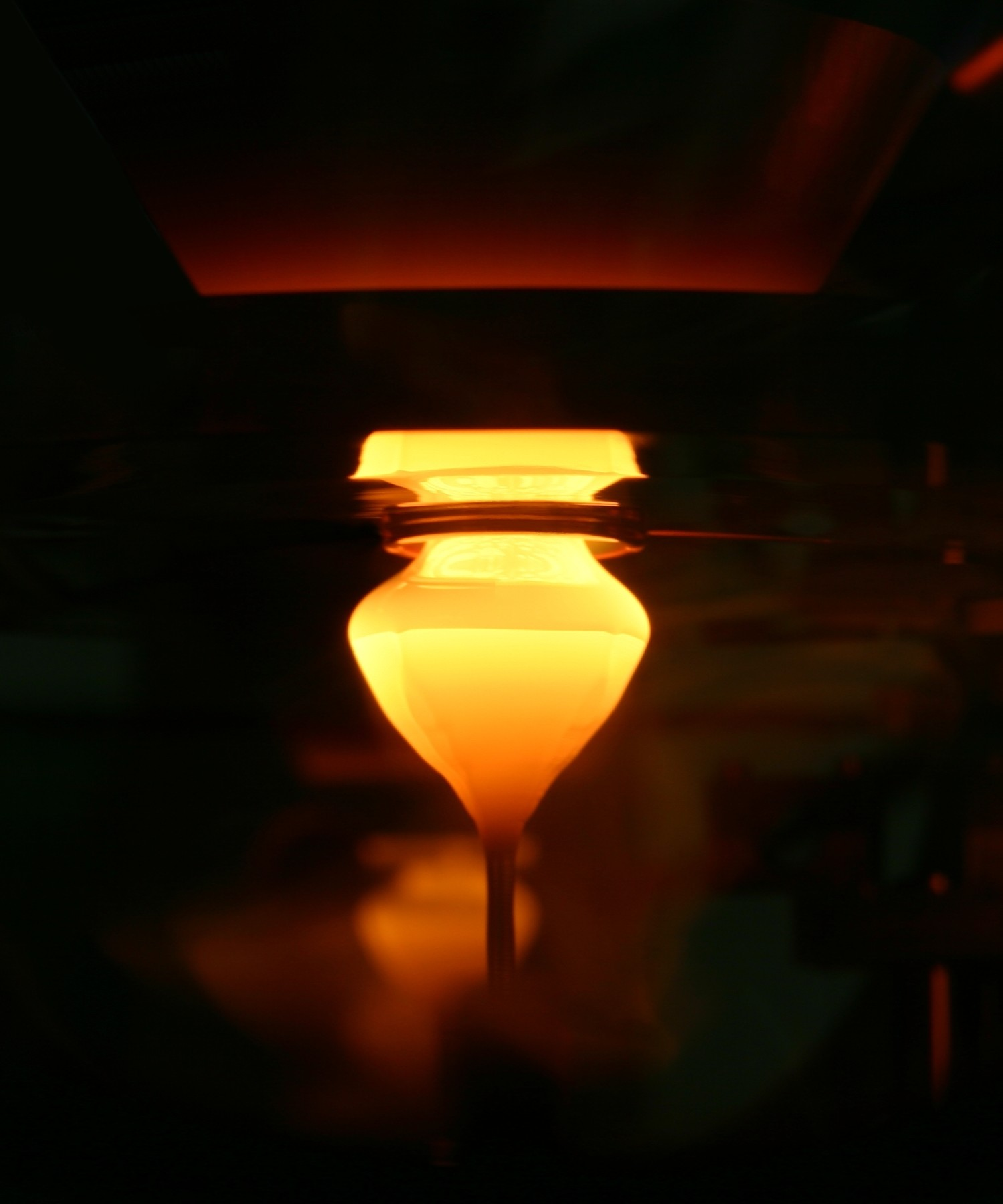
Silicon crystal in the beginning of the growth process

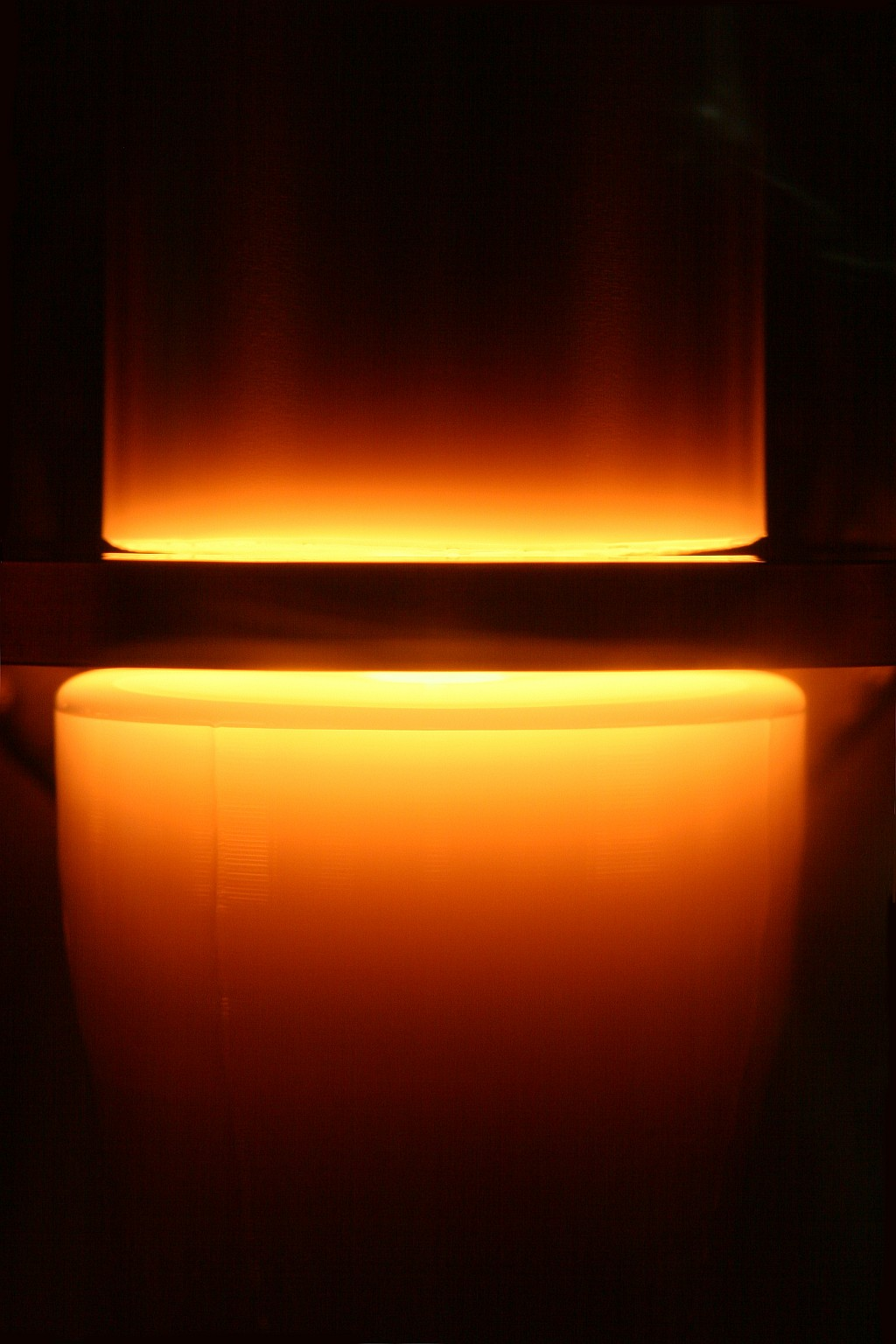
Growing silicon crystal

Float-zone (FZ) silicon is very pure silicon obtained by vertical zone melting. The process was developed at Bell Labs by Henry Theurer in 1955 as a modification of a method developed by Bill Pfann for germanium. In the vertical configuration molten silicon has sufficient surface tension to keep the charge from separating. The major advantages is crucibleless growth that prevents contamination of the silicon from the vessel itself and therefore an inherently high-purity alternative to boule crystals grown by the Czochralski method (CZ).

The concentrations of light impurities, such as carbon (C) and oxygen (O_{2}) elements, are extremely low. Another light impurity, nitrogen (N_{2}), helps to control microdefects and also brings about an improvement in the mechanical strength of the wafers, and is now being intentionally added during the growth stages.

The diameters of float-zone wafers are generally not greater than 200 mm due to the surface tension limitations during growth. A polycrystalline rod of ultrapure electronic-grade silicon is passed through an RF heating coil, which creates a localized molten zone from which the crystal ingot grows. A seed crystal is used at one end to start the growth. The whole process is carried out in an evacuated chamber or in an inert gas purge.

The molten zone carries the impurities away with it and hence reduces impurity concentration (most impurities are more soluble in the melt than the crystal). Specialized doping techniques like core doping, pill doping, gas doping and neutron transmutation doping are used to incorporate a uniform concentration of desirable impurity.

Float-zone silicon wafers can be converted into doped semiconductors through processes such as ion implantation.

== Application ==
Float-zone silicon is typically used for power devices and detector applications, where high-resistivity is required. It is highly transparent to terahertz radiation, and is usually used to fabricate optical components, such as lenses and windows, for terahertz applications. It is also used in solar arrays of satellites as it has higher conversion efficiency.

== See also ==
- Bridgman–Stockbarger method
- Micro-pulling-down
- Laser-heated pedestal growth
