= International Annealed Copper Standard =

Unit of electrical conductivity

The International Annealed Copper Standard (IACS) is a standard established in 1914 by the United States Department of Commerce. It is an empirically derived standard value for the electrical conductivity of commercially available copper.

Sometime around 1913, several copper samples from 14 important refiners and wire manufacturers were analyzed by the U.S. Bureau of Standards. The average resistance of the samples was determined to be 0.15292 Ω for copper wires with a mass of 1 gram of uniform cross section and 1 meter in length at 20 °C. In the United States this is usually written as "0.15292 ohm (meter, gram) at 20 °C".

Germany proposed a slight modification of this value to "0.15328 ohm (meter, gram) at 20 °C", this being equivalent to a conductivity of exactly 58×10^{6} S/m at 20 °C. The German modification was adopted by the International Electrotechnical Commission in 1913 and subsequently published by the United States Department of Commerce on October 1, 1914 as the International Annealed Copper Standard (IACS).

The standard is most often used as a comparative property in the specification of the conductivity of other metals. For example, the conductivity of a particular grade of titanium may be specified as 1.2 % IACS, meaning that its electrical conductivity is 1.2 % of the copper specified as the IACS standard.

The standard can be found at https://archive.org/stream/copperwiretables31unituoft#page/n0/mode/1up.

== Quality of aluminum alloys ==
Heat treatment will alter several properties of an alloy, many of which are important to a design engineer. A measurement of the electric conductivity of aluminum alloys can be used to verify that a heat treatment process has been done correctly. For example a component made of "7075" alloy which was correctly treated with the process "T73" to gain resistance to stress corrosion cracking will fall in the range of 38.0 to 43.0 % IACS.

The acceptance criteria for electrical conductivity of finished or semi-finished parts of wrought aluminum alloys are contained in SAE International specification AMS2658 Hardness and Conductivity Inspection of Wrought Aluminum Alloy Parts. Here the values are given in reference to the IACS.

A method for measuring electrical conductivity is described in ASTM International specification ASTM E 1004 Electromagnetic (Eddy-Current) Measurements of Electrical Conductivity. Electrical conductivity meters with direct readout in %IACS are commercially available.
