= Calcium hydroxide =

Inorganic compound of formula Ca(OH)_{2}

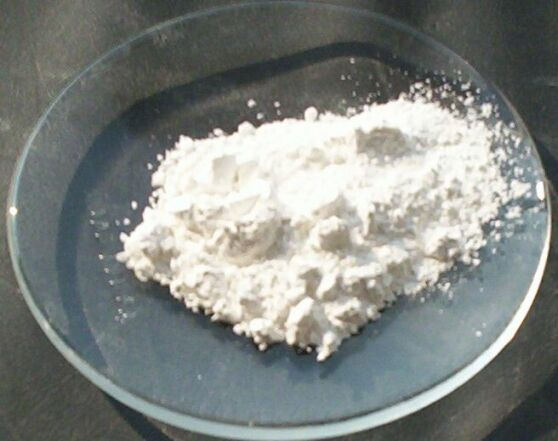
- Calcium hydroxide

Names
- IUPAC name calcium dihydroxide
- Other names: Slaked lime; Milk of lime; Calcium(II) hydroxide; Pickling lime; Hydrated lime; Portlandite; Calcium hydrate; Calcium dihydroxide

Identifiers
CAS Number	1305-62-0
3D model (JSmol)	Interactive image; Interactive image
ChEBI	CHEBI:31341
ChemSpider	14094
ECHA InfoCard	100.013.762
EC Number	215-137-3
E number	E526 (acidity regulators, ...)
Gmelin Reference	846915
KEGG	D01083
PubChem CID	14777
RTECS number	EW2800000
UNII	PF5DZW74VN
CompTox Dashboard (EPA)	DTXSID7034410
- InChI: InChI=1S/Ca.2H2O/h;2*1H2/q+2;;/p-2 Key: AXCZMVOFGPJBDE-UHFFFAOYSA-L; InChI=1/Ca.2H2O/h;2*1H2/q+2;;/p-2 Key: AXCZMVOFGPJBDE-NUQVWONBAD
- SMILES: [Ca+2].[OH-].[OH-]; [OH-].[OH-].[Ca+2]

Properties
Chemical formula	Ca(OH)_{2}
Molar mass	74.093 g/mol
Appearance	White powder
Odor	Odorless
Density	2.211 g/cm^{3}, solid
Melting point	580 °C (1,076 °F; 853 K) (loses water, decomposes)
Solubility in water	1.89 g/L (0 °C); 1.73 g/L (20 °C); 0.66 g/L (100 °C); (retrograde solubility, i.e., unusually decreasing with T)
Solubility product (K_{sp})	5.02×10^{−6}
Solubility	Soluble in glycerol and acids.; Insoluble in ethanol.
Basicity (pK_{b})	pK_{b1} = 1.37 pK_{b2} = 2.43
Magnetic susceptibility (χ)	−22.0·10^{−6} cm^{3}/mol
Refractive index (n_{D})	1.574

Structure
Crystal structure	Hexagonal, hP3
Space group	P3̅m1 No. 164
Lattice constant	a = 0.35853 nm, c = 0.4895 nm

Thermochemistry
Heat capacity (C)	87.5 J/(mol K)
Std molar entropy (S^{⦵}_{298})	83 J·mol^{−1}·K^{−1}
Std enthalpy of formation (Δ_{f}H^{⦵}_{298})	−987 kJ·mol^{−1}

Hazards
- GHS labelling
Pictograms	(GHS05: Corrosive) (GHS07: Exclamation mark)
Signal word	Danger
Hazard statements	H314, H335, H402
Precautionary statements	P261, P280, P305+P351+P338
NFPA 704 (fire diamond)	3 0 0
Flash point	Non-flammable
- Lethal dose or concentration (LD, LC)
LD_{50} (median dose)	7340 mg/kg (oral, rat); 7300 mg/kg (mouse)
- NIOSH (US health exposure limits)
PEL (Permissible)	TWA 15 mg/m^{3} (total) 5 mg/m^{3} (resp.)
REL (Recommended)	TWA 5 mg/m^{3}
IDLH (Immediate danger)	N.D.
- Safety data sheet (SDS)

Related compounds
Other cations	Magnesium hydroxide Strontium hydroxide Barium hydroxide
Related bases	Calcium oxide

Supplementary data page
- Calcium hydroxide (data page)
- Except where otherwise noted, data are given for materials in their standard state (at 25 °C [77 °F], 100 kPa). verify (what is ?) Infobox references

Calcium hydroxide (traditionally called slaked lime) is an inorganic compound with the chemical formula Ca(OH)_{2}. It is a colorless crystal or white powder and is produced when quicklime (calcium oxide) is mixed with water. Annually, approximately 125 million tons of calcium hydroxide are produced worldwide.

Calcium hydroxide has many names, including hydrated lime, caustic lime, builders' lime, slaked lime, cal, and pickling lime. Calcium hydroxide is used in many applications, including food preparation, where it has been identified as E number E526. Limewater and milk of lime are common names for a saturated solution of calcium hydroxide.

== Solubility ==
Calcium hydroxide is moderately soluble in water, as seen for many dihydroxides. Its solubility increases from 0.66 g/L at 100 °C to 1.89 g/L at 0 °C. Its solubility product K_{sp} of 5.02×10^{−6} at 25 °C, its dissociation in water is large enough that its solutions are basic according to the following dissolution reaction:

Ca(OH)_{2} → Ca^{2+} + 2 OH^{−}

The solubility is affected by the common-ion effect. Its solubility drastically decreases upon addition of hydroxide or calcium sources.

== Reactions ==
When heated to 512 °C, the partial pressure of water in equilibrium with calcium hydroxide reaches 101 kPa (normal atmospheric pressure), which decomposes calcium hydroxide into calcium oxide and water:

Ca(OH)_{2} → CaO + H_{2}O

When carbon dioxide is passed through limewater, the solution takes on a milky appearance due to precipitation of insoluble calcium carbonate:

Ca(OH)_{2}(aq) + CO_{2}(g) → CaCO_{3}(s) + H_{2}O(l)

If excess CO_{2} is added: the following reaction takes place:

CaCO_{3}(s) + H_{2}O(l) + CO_{2}(g) → Ca(HCO_{3})_{2}(aq)

The milkiness disappears since calcium bicarbonate is water-soluble.

Calcium hydroxide reacts with aluminium. This reaction is the basis of aerated concrete. It does not corrode iron and steel, owing to passivation of their surface.

Calcium hydroxide reacts with hydrochloric acid to give calcium hydroxychloride and then calcium chloride.

In a process called sulfation, sulphur dioxide reacts with limewater:

Ca(OH)_{2}(aq) + SO_{2}(g) → CaSO_{3}(s) + H_{2}O(l)

Limewater is used in a process known as lime softening to reduce water hardness. It is also used as a neutralizing agent in municipal waste water treatment.

== Structure and preparation ==
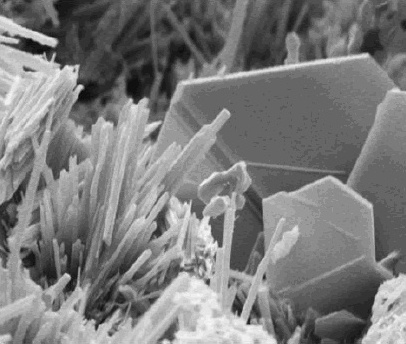
SEM image of fractured hardened cement paste, showing plates of calcium hydroxide and needles of ettringite (micron scale)

Calcium hydroxide adopts a polymeric structure, as do all metal hydroxides. The structure is identical to that of Mg(OH)_{2} (brucite structure); i.e., the cadmium iodide motif. Strong hydrogen bonds exist between the layers.

Calcium hydroxide is produced commercially by treating (slaking) quicklime with water:

CaO + H_{2}O → Ca(OH)_{2}

Alongside the production of quicklime from limestone by calcination, this is one of the oldest known chemical reactions; evidence of prehistoric production dates back to at least 7000 BCE.

== Uses ==
Calcium hydroxide is commonly used to prepare lime mortar.

One significant application of calcium hydroxide is as a flocculant, in water and sewage treatment. It forms a fluffy charged solid that aids in the removal of smaller particles from water, resulting in a clearer product. This application is enabled by the low cost and low toxicity of calcium hydroxide. It is also used in fresh-water treatment for raising the pH of the water so that pipes will not corrode where the base water is acidic, because it is self-regulating and does not raise the pH too much.

Another large application is in the paper industry, where it is an intermediate in the reaction in the production of sodium hydroxide. This conversion is part of the causticizing step in the Kraft process for making pulp. In the causticizing operation, burned lime is added to green liquor, which is a solution primarily of sodium carbonate and sodium sulfate produced by dissolving smelt, which is the molten form of these chemicals from the recovery furnace.

In orchard crops, calcium hydroxide is used as a fungicide. Applications of 'lime water' prevent the development of cankers caused by the fungal pathogen Neonectria galligena. The trees are sprayed when they are dormant in winter to prevent toxic burns from the highly reactive calcium hydroxide. This use is authorised in the European Union and the United Kingdom under Basic Substance regulations.

Calcium hydroxide is used in dentistry, primarily in the specialty of endodontics due to its antibacterial properties and induction of hard-tissue deposition.

=== Food industry ===
Because of its low toxicity and the mildness of its basic properties, slaked lime is widely used in the food industry,

- In USDA-certified food production in plants and livestock
- To clarify raw juice from sugarcane and sugar beets in the sugar industry (see Carbonatation)
- To process water for alcoholic beverages and soft drinks
- To increase the rate of Maillard reactions (e.g., in pretzels)
- In pickling cucumbers and other foods
- To make Chinese century eggs
- In maize preparation: removes the cellulose hulls of maize kernels (see nixtamalization)
- To clear a brine of carbonates of calcium and magnesium in the manufacture of salt for food and pharmaceutical uses
- As a calcium supplement in fruit drinks, such as orange juice, and infant formula
- As a substitute for baking soda in making papadam
- In the removal of carbon dioxide from controlled-atmosphere produce storage rooms
- In the preparation of mushroom-growing substrates

==== Native American uses ====
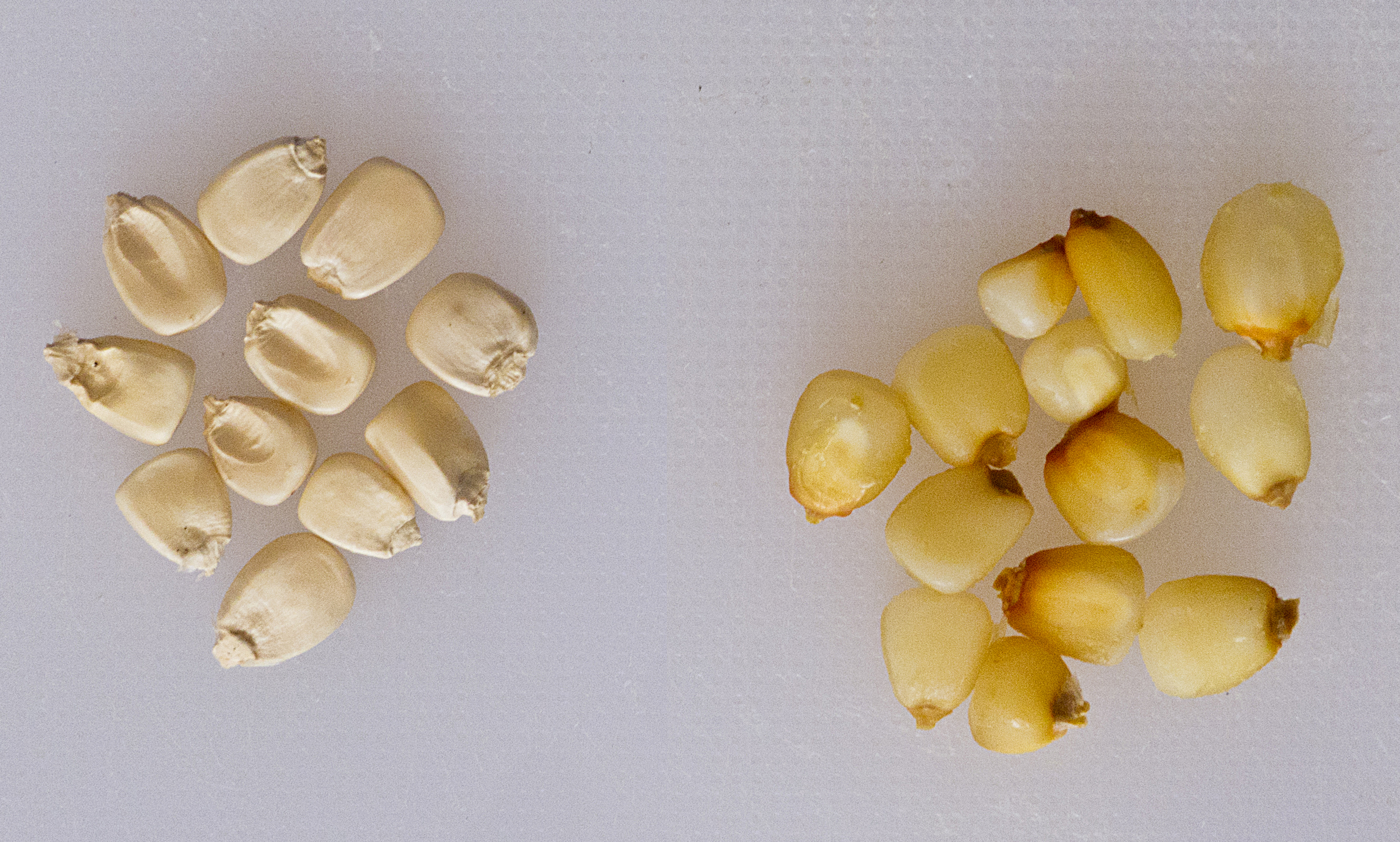
Dry untreated maize (left), and treated maize (right) after boiling in water with calcium hydroxide (15 ml, or 1 tbsp, lime for 500 g of corn) for 15 minutes

In Nahuatl, the language of the Aztecs, the word for calcium hydroxide is nextli. In a process called nixtamalization, maize is cooked with nextli to become nixtamal, also known as hominy. Nixtamalization significantly increases the bioavailability of niacin (vitamin B_{3}), preventing pellagra. Nixtamal is also considered tastier and easier to digest. It is often ground into a flour, known as masa, which is used to make tortillas and tamales, which cannot be done with non-nixtamalized maize.

In chewing coca leaves, calcium hydroxide is usually chewed alongside to keep the alkaloid stimulants chemically available for absorption by the body. Similarly, Native Americans traditionally chewed tobacco leaves with calcium hydroxide derived from burnt mollusc shells to enhance the effects. It has also been used by some indigenous South American tribes as an ingredient in yopo, a psychedelic snuff prepared from the beans of some Anadenanthera species.

==== Asian uses ====
In South and Southeast Asia, calcium hydroxide – locally known by names including chuna, choona, apog or soon – is typically added to a bundle of areca nut and betel leaf called "paan" or buyo to keep the alkaloid stimulants chemically available to enter the bloodstream via sublingual absorption.

Choona is a key ingredient in Petha, contributing to its characteristic crunchy and firm texture.

It is used in making naswar (also known as nass or niswar), a type of dipping tobacco made from fresh tobacco leaves, Choona, and wood ash. It is consumed most in the Pathan diaspora in Afghanistan, Pakistan, India and Bangladesh. Villagers also use calcium hydroxide to paint their mud houses in Afghanistan, Pakistan and India.

Traditionally lime water was used in Taiwan and China to preserve persimmon and to remove astringency.

=== Hobby uses ===
In buon fresco painting, limewater is used as the colour solvent to apply on fresh plaster. Historically, it is known as the paint whitewash.

Limewater is widely used by marine aquarists as a primary supplement of calcium and alkalinity for reef aquariums. Corals of order Scleractinia build their endoskeletons from aragonite (a polymorph of calcium carbonate). When used for this purpose, limewater is usually referred to as Kalkwasser. It is also used in tanning and making parchment. The lime is used as a dehairing agent based on its alkaline properties.

=== Personal care and adornment ===
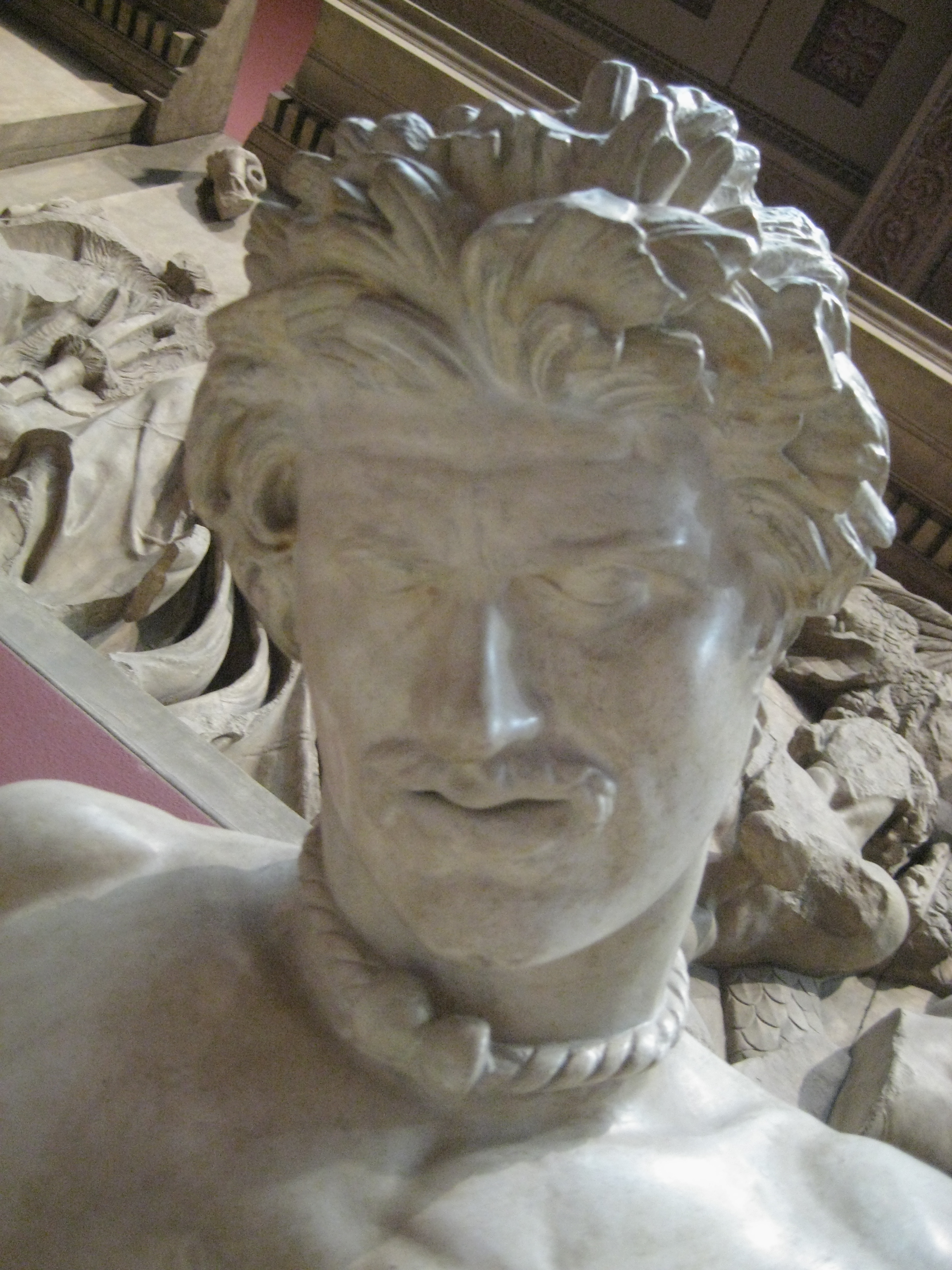
Closeup of cast of The Dying Gaul, showing distinctive hairstyle, supposedly derived from washing in limewater

Treating one's hair with limewater causes it to stiffen and bleach, with the added benefit of killing any lice or mites living there. Diodorus Siculus described the Celts as follows: "The Gauls are tall of body, with rippling muscles, and white of skin, and their hair is blond, and not only naturally so, but they also make it their practice by artificial means to increase the distinguishing colour which nature has given it. For they are always washing their hair in lime-water, and they pull it back from the forehead to the top of the head and back to the nape of the neck, with the result that their appearance is like that of Satyrs and Pans, since the treatment of their hair makes it so heavy and coarse that it differs in no respect from the mane of horses."

Calcium hydroxide is also applied in a leather process called liming.

== In stars ==
The ion CaOH^{+} has been detected in the atmosphere of S-type stars.

== Limewater ==
Limewater is a saturated aqueous solution of calcium hydroxide. Calcium hydroxide is sparsely soluble at room temperature in water (1.5 g/L at 25 °C). "Pure" (i.e., less than or fully saturated) limewater is clear and colorless, with a slight earthy smell and an astringent/bitter taste. It is basic in nature with a pH of 12.4. Limewater is named after limestone, not the lime fruit. Limewater may be prepared by mixing calcium hydroxide (Ca(OH)_{2}) with water and removing excess calcium hydroxide (e.g., by filtration). When excess calcium hydroxide is added (or when environmental conditions are altered, e.g., when its temperature is raised sufficiently), there results a milky solution due to the homogeneous suspension of excess calcium hydroxide. This liquid has been known traditionally as milk of lime.

== Health risks ==
Exposure to Ca(OH)_{2}, as with any strong base, can cause skin burns, but it is not acutely toxic.

== See also ==
- Baralyme – Carbon dioxide scrubber absorbent mixture of calcium and barium hydroxides (carbon dioxide absorbent)
- Cement – Hydraulic binder used in the composition of mortar and concrete
- Lime mortar – Building material
- Lime plaster – Type of plaster composed of sand, water, and lime
- Plaster – Broad range of building and sculpture materials
- Magnesium hydroxide – Inorganic compound of formula Mg(OH)_{2} (results in a less alkaline aqueous solution due to lower solubility)
- Soda lime – Chemical mixture for absorbing carbon dioxide
- Whitewash – Paint made from lime and chalk
- On Food and Cooking – Book by Harold McGee
