= SWAS =

SWAS may refer to:

- South Western Ambulance Service, an organization that provides ambulance services across South West England
- Steam and water analysis system
- Submillimeter Wave Astronomy Satellite
