= Supersaturation =

State of a solution that contains more solute than can be dissolved at equilibrium

In physical chemistry, supersaturation occurs with a solution when the concentration of a solute exceeds the concentration specified by the value of solubility at equilibrium. Most commonly the term is applied to a solution of a solid in a liquid, but it can also be applied to liquids and gases dissolved in a liquid. A supersaturated solution is in a metastable state; it may return to equilibrium by separation of the excess of solute from the solution, by dilution of the solution by adding solvent, or by increasing the solubility of the solute in the solvent.

== History ==
Solubility of Na_{2}SO_{4} in water as a function of temperature.

Early studies of the phenomenon were conducted with sodium sulfate, also known as Glauber's Salt because, unusually, the solubility of this salt in water decreases with increasing temperature past 33 °C. Early studies have been summarised by Tomlinson. It was shown that the crystallization of a supersaturated solution does not simply come from its agitation, (the previous belief) but from solid matter entering and acting as a "starting" site for crystals to form, now called "seeds" (for more information, see nucleation). Expanding upon this, Gay-Lussac brought attention to the kinematics of salt ions and the characteristics of the container having an impact on the supersaturation state. He was also able to expand upon the number of salts with which a supersaturated solution can be obtained. Later Henri Löwel came to the conclusion that both nuclei of the solution and the walls of the container have a catalyzing effect on the solution that cause crystallization. Explaining and providing a model for this phenomenon has been a task taken on by more recent research. Désiré Gernez contributed to this research by discovering that nuclei must be of the same salt that is being crystallized in order to promote crystallization.

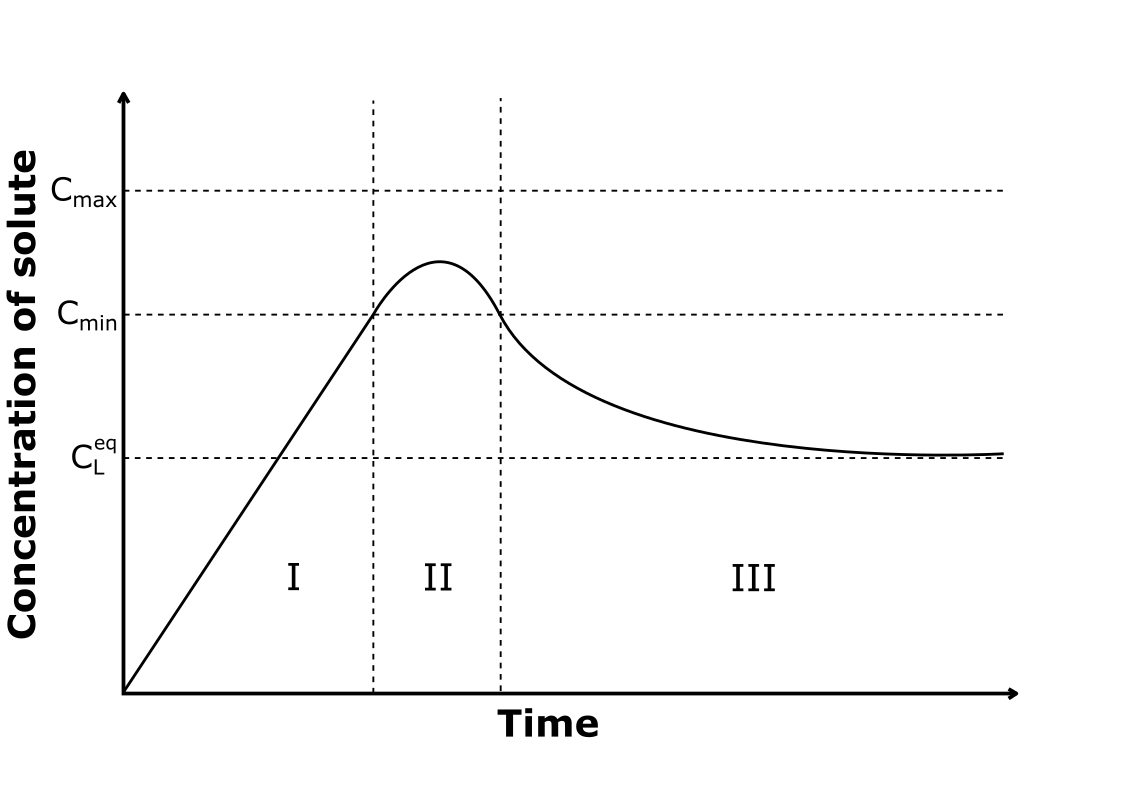
Time evolution of the concentration of a solute in a solution when it receives a constant inflow of the solute, according to the LaMer model.

Furthermore, in 1950, Victor K. LaMer proposed another theory for nucleation, in which he described the nucleation and growth of sulfur nuclei in a solution where a chemical reaction provided a constant inflow of molecularly dissolved sulfur. This theory, however, is not confined to this specific case and can be generalised as shown in LaMer’s diagram, provided in the second figure of this section.

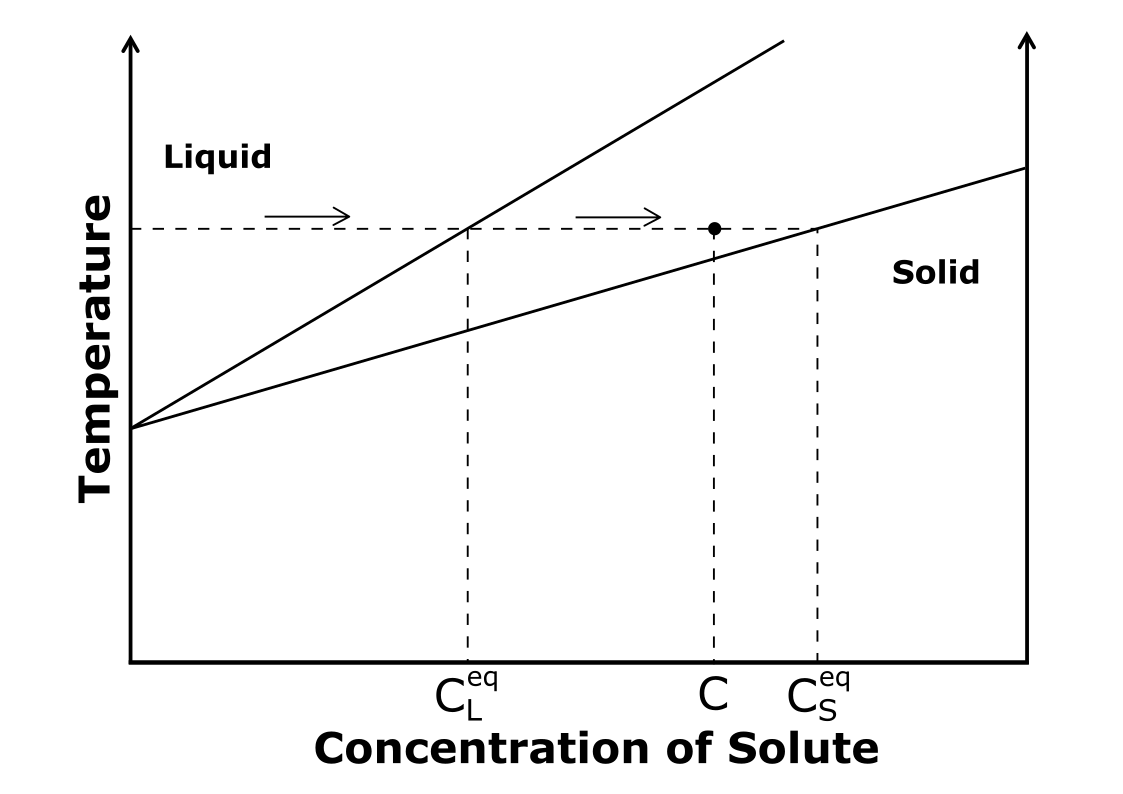
Dependence of equilibrium (saturation) concentration of a solute with temperature. The leftmost function represents the equilibrium between an undersaturated solution and a supersaturated solution, while the rightmost function represents the equilibrium between a supersaturated solution and a solid (where the solute has fully crystallised). At a constant temperature, solute is added to the solution, so that its concentration evolves following the arrows. The solution will become saturated upon reaching $c_L^{eq} \,\!$, and will fully crystallise upon reaching $c_S^{eq} \,\!$.

In section (I), the concentration of solute grows linearly, as it is formed (or added) to the solution. Upon reaching $c_L^{eq} \,\!$, it will become saturated, but it won't start depositing solute right away. Instead, it will keep absorbing it, becoming supersaturated.

In section (II), concentration reaches critical saturation levels, $c_{min} \,\!$, when solute crystals begin nucleating. The appearance of nuclei partially relieves the supersaturation, at least rapidly enough that the rate of nucleation falls almost immediately to zero. The system rapidly reaches a balance between the solute supply and the consumption rate for the nucleation and its growth, slowing down the increase in its concentration. After reaching the peak, the curve declines owing to the increasing consumption of the solute for the growth of nuclei and reaches again the critical level of nucleation, $c_{min} \,\!$, ending the nucleation stage. Given optimal conditions, having the solute be introduced to the solution very steadily while keeping the system free from perturbations and nucleation seeds, the maximum concentration that can be achieved in this way is defined as $c_{max} \,\!$.

In section (III), the supersaturation becomes too low for any more crystals to nucleate, so no new crystals are formed. However, as the solution is still supersaturated, the existing crystals grow by solute diffusion. As time passes by, the growth rate of the crystal equals the rate of solute supply, so the concentration converges to the saturation value $c_L^{eq} \,\!$.

== Occurrence and examples ==
=== Solid precipitate, liquid solvent ===
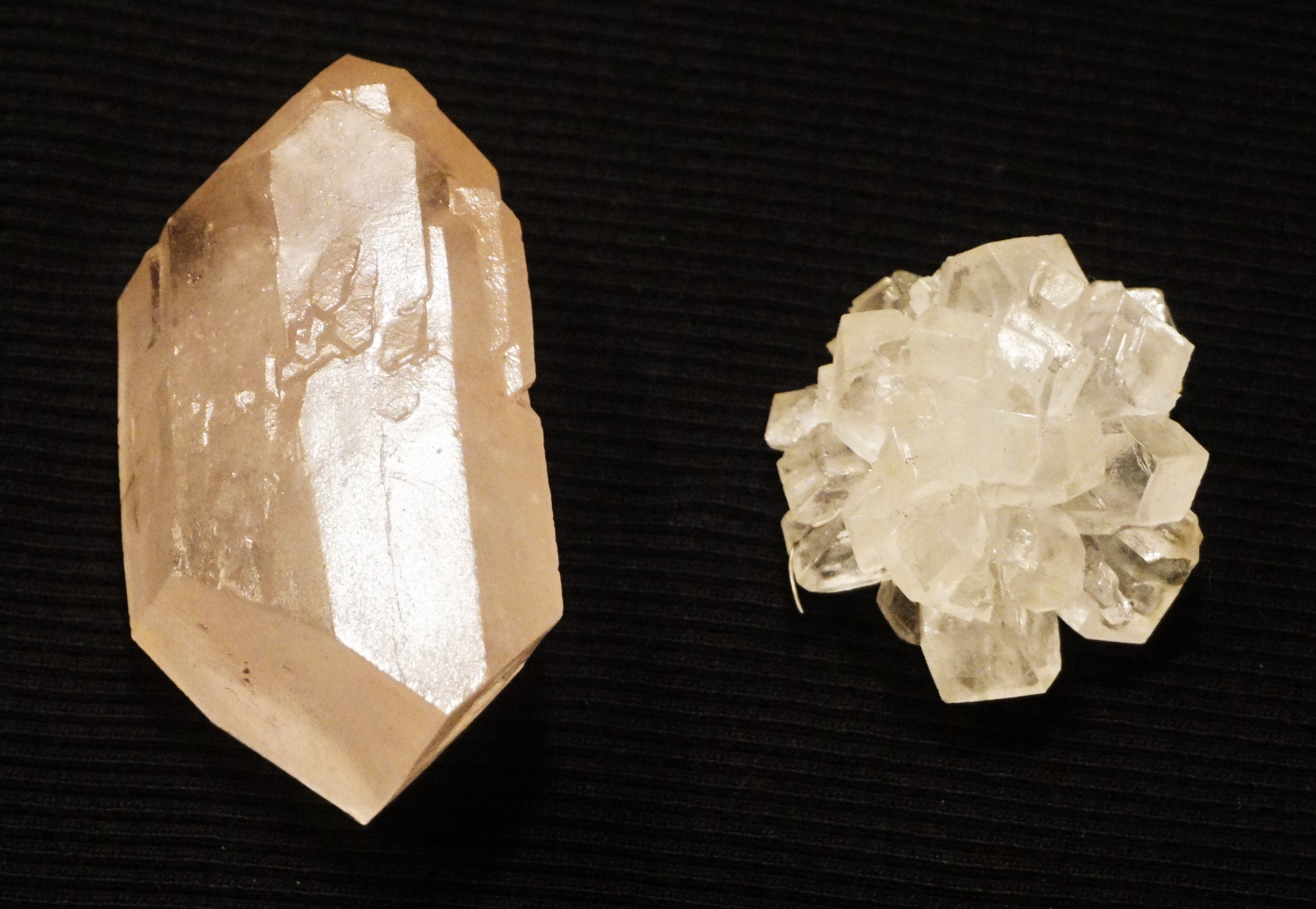
Crystallized sugar (rock candy) is made by adding a seed crystal to a supersaturated solution of table sugar and water. The multiple crystals on the right were grown from a sugar cube, while the left was grown from a single seed taken from the right. A red dye was added to the solution for the left crystal, but was insoluble with the solid sugar, and only traces remain while the rest precipitated out.

A solution of a chemical compound in a liquid will become supersaturated when the temperature of the saturated solution is changed. In most cases solubility decreases with decreasing temperature; in such cases the excess of solute will rapidly separate from the solution as crystals or an amorphous powder. In a few cases the opposite effect occurs. The example of sodium sulfate in water is well-known and this was why it was used in early studies of solubility.

Recrystallization is a process used to purify chemical compounds. A mixture of the impure compound and solvent is heated until the compound has dissolved. If there is some solid impurity remaining it is removed by filtration. When the temperature of the solution is subsequently lowered it briefly becomes supersaturated and then the compound crystallizes out until chemical equilibrium at the lower temperature is achieved. Impurities remain in the supernatant liquid. In some cases crystals do not form quickly and the solution remains supersaturated after cooling. This is because there is a thermodynamic barrier to the formation of a crystal in a liquid medium. Commonly this is overcome by adding a tiny crystal of the solute compound to the supersaturated solution, a process known as "seeding". Another process in common use is to rub a rod on the side of a glass vessel containing the solution to release microscopic glass particles which can act as nucleation centres. In industry, centrifugation is used to separate the crystals from the supernatant liquid.

Some compounds and mixtures of compounds can form long-living supersaturated solutions. Carbohydrates are a class of such compounds; The thermodynamic barrier to formation of crystals is rather high because of extensive and irregular hydrogen bonding with the solvent, water. For example, although sucrose can be recrystallised easily, its hydrolysis product, known as "invert sugar" or "golden syrup" is a mixture of glucose and fructose that exists as a viscous, supersaturated, liquid. Clear honey contains carbohydrates which may crystallize over a period of weeks.

Supersaturation may be encountered when attempting to crystallize a protein.

=== Gaseous solute, liquid solvent ===
The solubility of a gas in a liquid increases with increasing gas pressure. When the external pressure is reduced, the excess gas comes out of solution.

Fizzy drinks are made by subjecting the liquid to carbon dioxide, under pressure. In champagne the CO_{2} is produced naturally in the final stage of fermentation. When the container is opened some gas is released in the form of bubbles.

Release of gas from supersaturated tissues can cause an underwater diver to suffer from decompression sickness (a.k.a. the bends) when returning to the surface. This can be fatal if the released gas obstructs critical blood supplies causing ischaemia in vital tissues.

Dissolved gases can be released during oil exploration when a strike is made. This occurs because the oil in oil-bearing rock is under considerable pressure from the over-lying rock, allowing the oil to be supersaturated with respect to dissolved gases.

=== Liquid formation from a mixture of gases ===
A cloudburst is an extreme form of production of liquid water from a supersaturated mixture of air and water vapour in the atmosphere. Supersaturation in the vapour phase is related to the surface tension of liquids through the Kelvin equation, the Gibbs–Thomson effect and the Poynting effect.

The International Association for the Properties of Water and Steam (IAPWS) provides a special equation for the Gibbs free energy in the metastable-vapor region of water in its Revised Release on the IAPWS Industrial Formulation 1997 for the Thermodynamic Properties of Water and Steam. All thermodynamic properties for the metastable-vapor region of water can be derived from this equation by means of the appropriate relations of thermodynamic properties to the Gibbs free energy.

== Measurement ==
When measuring the concentration of a solute in a supersaturated gaseous or liquid mixture it is obvious that the pressure inside the cuvette may be greater than the ambient pressure. When this is so a specialized cuvette must be used. The choice of analytical technique to use will depend on the characteristics of the analyte.

== Applications ==
The characteristics of supersaturation have practical applications in terms of pharmaceuticals. By creating a supersaturated solution of a certain drug, it can be ingested in liquid form. The drug can be made driven into a supersaturated state through any normal mechanism and then prevented from precipitating out by adding precipitation inhibitors. Drugs in this state are referred to as "supersaturating drug delivery services," or "SDDS." Oral consumption of a drug in this form is simple and allows for the measurement of very precise dosages. Primarily, it provides a means for drugs with very low solubility to be made into aqueous solutions. In addition, some drugs can undergo supersaturation inside the body despite being ingested in a crystalline form. This phenomenon is known as in vivo supersaturation.

The identification of supersaturated solutions can be used as a tool for marine ecologists to study the activity of organisms and populations. Photosynthetic organisms release O_{2} gas into the water. Thus, an area of the ocean supersaturated with O_{2} gas can likely determined to be rich with photosynthetic activity. Though some O_{2} will naturally be found in the ocean due to simple physical chemical properties, upwards of 70% of all oxygen gas found in supersaturated regions can be attributed to photosynthetic activity.

Supersaturation in vapor phase is usually present in the expansion process through steam nozzles that operate with superheated steam at the inlet, which transitions to saturated state at the outlet. Supersaturation thus becomes an important factor to be taken into account in the design of steam turbines, as this results in an actual mass flow of steam through the nozzle being about 1 to 3% greater than the theoretically calculated value that would be expected if the expanding steam underwent a reversible adiabatic process through equilibrium states. In these cases supersaturation occurs due to the fact that the expansion process develops so rapidly and in such a short time, that the expanding vapor cannot reach its equilibrium state in the process, behaving as if it were superheated. Hence the determination of the expansion ratio, relevant to the calculation of the mass flow through the nozzle, must be done using an adiabatic index of approximately 1.3, like that of the superheated steam, instead of 1.135, which is the value that should have to be used for a quasi-static adiabatic expansion in the saturated region.

The study of supersaturation is also relevant to atmospheric studies. Since the 1940s, the presence of supersaturation in the atmosphere has been known. When water is supersaturated in the troposphere, the formation of ice lattices is frequently observed. In a state of saturation, the water particles will not form ice under tropospheric conditions. It is not enough for molecules of water to form an ice lattice at saturation pressures; they require a surface to condense on to or conglomerations of liquid water molecules of water to freeze. For these reasons, relative humidities over ice in the atmosphere can be found above 100%, meaning supersaturation has occurred. Supersaturation of water is actually very common in the upper troposphere, occurring between 20% and 40% of the time. This can be determined using satellite data from the Atmospheric Infrared Sounder.
