= Steam and water analysis system =

Steam and water analysis system (SWAS) is a system dedicated to the analysis of steam or water. In power stations, it is usually used to analyze boiler steam and water to ensure the water used to generate electricity is clean from impurities which can cause corrosion to any metallic surface, such as in boiler and turbine.

== Steam and water analysis system (SWAS) ==
Corrosion and erosion are major concerns in thermal power plants operating on steam. The steam reaching the turbines must be ultra-pure and hence needs to be monitored for its quality. A Steam and Water Analysis system (SWAS) monitors critical parameters in the steam. These parameters include pH, conductivity, silica, sodium, dissolved oxygen, phosphate and chlorides. A well designed SWAS ensures that the sample is representative until the point of analysis. To achieve this, it is important to take care of the following aspects of the sample:

1. Sample Extraction
2. Sample Transport
3. Conditioning
4. Analysis
5. Controls

These aspects are explained in international standards like ASME PTC 19.11-2008 and VGB S006 -00 2012_09_EN. The International Association for the Properties of Water and Steam (IAPWS) also provides information on significant measurement points.

Sample handling system components are the most important pressure parts of sample handling system and need to have certification from ASME Section VIII Div1 & Div2 or PED. Also many times country-specific certifications required like

- American: ASME Section VIII Div 1 and Div 2/ ASME U and S Stamp
- Europe: Pressure Equipment Directive (PED)
- India: Indian Boiler Regulation (IBR) form IIIC
- Malaysia: DOSH
- Russia: CU TR Certification

=== Sample extraction ===
Utilizing the correct sample extraction probe ensures that the sample that is going to be extracted for analysis represents the process conditions exactly. The validity of the analysis is dependent on the sample being truly representative. As the probe is going to be directly attached to the process pipe work, it may have to withstand severe conditions. For most applications, the sample probe is manufactured to the stringent codes applicable to high-pressure, high-temperature pipework.

The selection of the right type of probe depends on the process stream parameter to be measured, the required sample flow rate and the location of the sampling point (which is also called the 'tapping point'). An important aspect of the sample extraction probe design is that the steam must enter the probe at the same velocity as the steam flowing in the pipeline from where the sample (it can be steam or water) was extracted. These probes are designed as per ASTM D1066 standard for steam extraction and must be designed and tested for their structural integrity in high pressure, high temperature and high velocity of samples.

Sample extraction probes are necessary for proper analysis of suspended impurities like corrosion products, iron, and copper.

=== Sample Transport ===
Section#4 in ASME PTC 19.11-2008 standard describes details for designing of sample transportation lines. Following care need to take while designing of this sample transportation lines:

(1) Line Size Selection:

Following aspects are very important while designing of sample Transportation lines.

(a) Transportation time i.e. (Velocity) of sample from isokinetic sample extraction probes to sampling system should be as minimum. SWAS room must be located close to low pressure water (condensate) samples from CEP discharge and condensate Polishing plants with lesser velocities.

(b) Pressure drops in lines is an important aspect. It is very important that the sample meets least resistance. Hence joints and bends in the pipeline need to be minimal. Also, sample lines must be continuously sloping to avoid accumulation of samples in lines.

(2) Line Material:

Minimum Stainless steel SS316 Grade material must be used for sample Transport Lines. This is to avoid corrosion of lines which leads to wrong measurement and analysis. For High pressure and Temperature samples (Super heated steam, Reheated Steam, Saturated Steam, Separator drains, Feed water at Economizer inlets) SS316H must be used which withstand High Temperature of samples.

=== Sample conditioning system ===
Sample conditioning systems are also called sampling systems, Wet Panels or Wet Racks. This is intended to house various components for sample conditioning. This may be an open rack or a closed enclosure with a corridor in between. The system contains sample conditioning equipment and a grab sampling sink. In this system stage, a sample is first cooled in Sample Coolers, depressurized in Pressure Regulator and then fed to various analyzers while the flow characteristics is kept constant by means of Back Pressure Regulator.

The need to condition the sample exists because the sensors used for online analysis are not able to handle the water/steam sample at high temperatures or pressures. To maintain a common reference of analysis, the sample analysis should be done at 25 °C. However, due to temperature compensation logic being available in most of the analyzers today, it is a practice to cool the sample to 25–40 °C. with the help of a well engineered sample conditioning system and then feed the conditioned sample to the analyzers.

However, if an uncompensated sample is to be analyzed, it becomes essential to cool the sample to 25 °C +/- 1 °C. This can be achieved by two-stage cooling. In the first stage cooling (also known as 'primary cooling'), the sample is cooled by using available cooling water. In most of the countries, cooling water is available in the range of 30–32 °C. This cooling water can cool the sample unto 35 °C(considering an approach temperature of 3 to 5 °C). A sample cooler is used to achieve this. Sample cooler is a heat exchanger specially designed for SWAS applications. Preferred sample cooler for primary cooling is a double helix coil in shell type design providing contraflow heat exchange.

The remaining part of cooling (i.e. from 35 to 25 °C) is achieved by using chilled water in the secondary cooling circuit. A chilled water supply is required from the plant or else an independent chiller package can be considered for this purpose along with SWAS.

The sampling system can be an 'open-frame free standing' type design or a fully or partially closed design, depending on the choice of the user, the environment it is supposed to operate in & the criticality of operation.

=== Sample coolers ===
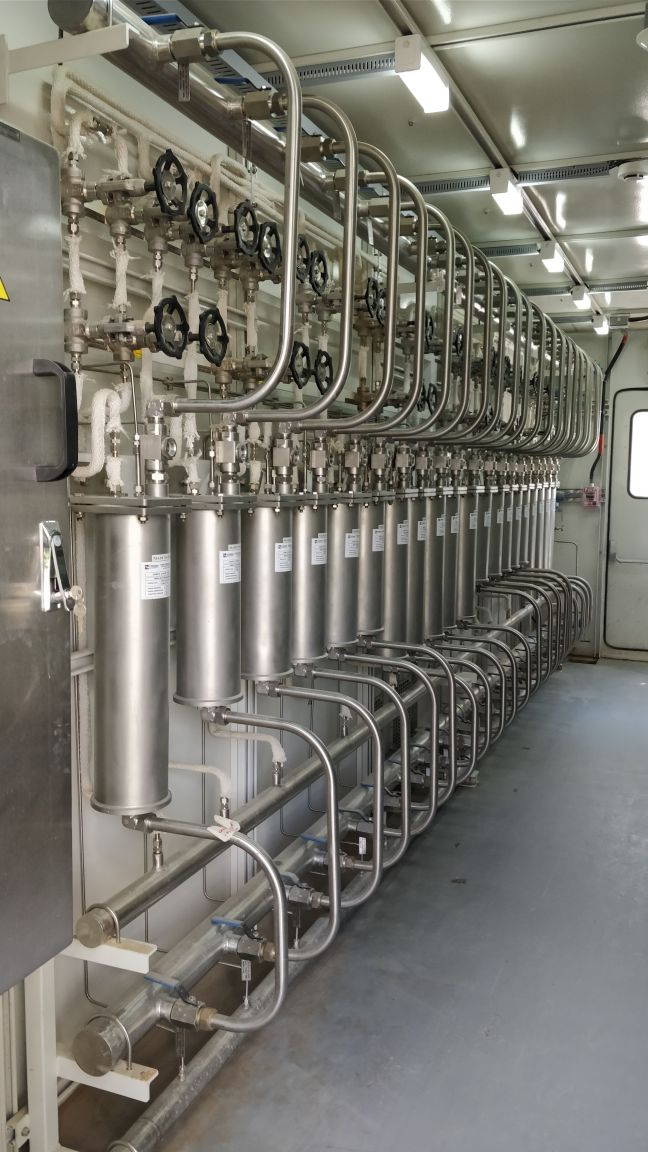
Typical Sample coolers in Steam and Water Analysis System

In the sampling system, sample coolers play a major role in bringing down the temperature of hot steam (or water) to a temperature acceptable to the sensors of the on-line analyser. Some of the important design aspects of sample coolers are:

1. Preferably a sample cooler design should be double helix, coil in shell type, so designed as to provide contra-flow heat exchange. This makes the sample cooler more compact, yet highly effective in terms of heat exchange.
2. Sample coils made of stainless steel SS-316 are suitable for normal cooling water conditions. However, if the chloride content in the cooling water is high (more than 35 ppm), then other suitable coil materials such as Monel or Inconel need to be used depending upon the quality of cooling water.
3. A “built-in” safety relief valve on shell side of the cooler is a must, so as to prevent explosion of the shell in event of sample coil failure.
4. The sample cooler design must be meeting ASME PTC 19.11 standard requirements.

Due to the sample coolers handling very high pressure, temperature steam, and water samples, Helical Tube Heat Exchangers were designed to fulfill Pressure vessel standards

These are unfired pressure vessels and thus designed inline with ASME Section VIII Div 1&2, Pressure Equipment Directives (PED) Standards. Also many countries asked for local certification like

- American: ASME Section VIII Div 1 and Div 2/ ASME U and S Stamp
- Europe: Pressure Equipment Directive (PED)
- India: Indian Boiler Regulation (IBR) form IIIC
- Malaysia: DOSH
- Russia: CU TR Certification

=== Pressure reducers ===
After the sample is cooled, the pressure of the sample must be reduced to meet the requirement of the sensors that receive this sample. Usually, the sensors like pH, conductivity, silica, sodium, and hydrazine require low pressure sample for healthy operation.

A rod-in-tube type of pressure reducer is the most effective method of pressure reduction recommended in ASME PTC19.11-2008 standard.

As per the latest technology, a Sample rod-in-tube pressure reducer with thermal and safety relief valve device is considered to be the most reliable and safe device. Single Rod in Tube System is a system in itself that takes care of some important aspects of sample conditioning. The pressure reducer in the Sampling system is rated for high very high pressure 450 Bar. There is no need of filters before the Rod in tube Pressure Reducers, as cleaning is on-line, without using any tools. For maintenance, no-shut-down is required for cleaning these pressure reducer.

=== Safety of analyzers against high temperature ===
Analyzers must be protected from high temperature samples. This is to avoid situations in case of failure of cooling water to primary sample coolers. There are various methods for stopping sample to analyzer in such a situation. The most popular and simple method is use of mechanical thermal shut off valves. These valves close and block samples to analyzer in case of cooling water failures.

These valves must be with:

(1) High pressure rating and designed inline with ASME standards to assure safety of operator and instruments downstream.

(2) This valves must be with MANUAL RESET design as recommended in ASME PTC 19.11-2008 standards.

(3) These valves must be equipped with potential free alarm contact for operator indication in Control system.

=== Online Analysis of Steam and Water Cycle Chemistry Parameters ===
A sample analysis system in some countries is also called Analyser Panel, Dry Panel or Dry Rack. It is usually a free-standing enclosed panel. The system contains the transmitter electronics, usually it is mounted on panels. In this system stage, sample is analyzed on its conductivity, pH, silica, phosphate, chloride, dissolved oxygen, hydrazine, sodium etc.

=== Online Conductivity measurements in SWAS ===
In Steam and Water Cycle conductivity measurement is a simple yet important measurement. Specific conductivity (total conductivity), acidic conductivity (conductivity after cation exchanger CACE) and degassed cation conductivity are measured at different location in steam and water cycle continuously Conductivity measurements give indication of contamination of water / steam with any kind of salts. These salts may get added to the water / steam from atmosphere or due to leakages in heat exchangers etc. The conductivity of ultra pure water is almost close to zero(as low as 0.05 microsiemens/cm), while with addition of even 1 ppm of any salt, the conductivity can shoot up to even more than 100 micro siemens/cm. Thus conductivity is a general indicator of plant malfunctioning or possible leakages.

Typical points in the steam circuit where conductivity should be monitored are. Drum steam, Drum water, High pressure heaters, Low pressure heaters, Condenser, Plant effluent, D.M. plant, Make-up water to D.M. plant.

Three types of conductivity measurement are usually done:

1. Specific conductivity,
2. Cation conductivity and
3. De-gassed cation conductivity.

There is a difference between these three types of measurements.

1. Specific conductivity gives overall conductivity value of the sample and is the most generic measurement
2. Cation conductivity is conductivity measurement after the Cation Column. At the Cation Column, the H+ resins replace the positive ions of all dissolved matter in the solution. When this happens, the treatment chemicals, which are desired ones (and are of basic or alkaline in nature) get converted to H_{2}O, i.e. water. (e.g. NH4OH + H(+) gives NH4+ and H_{2}O). The impurities are nothing but salts of different natures These get converted to respective acids (e.g. NaCl + H(+) gives HCl and Cl-). Thus masking effects of treatment chemicals on the conductivity value are eliminated, while the conversion of salts to corresponding acids has an effect of increase in their corresponding conductivity value to around three times its original value. Thus, in effect, cation conductivity acts as amplifier of conductivity due to impurities and eliminator of conductivity due to treatment chemicals.
3. De-gassed conductivity is the finest level of conductivity measurement. Here one removes the masking effects of dissolved gases, mainly CO_{2}, on the conductivity measurement. In the De-Gassed conductivity system, there is a reboiler chamber to heat the sample, so that the dissolved gases are liberated and then there is cooling mechanism, by which the hot liquid is cooled again. The conductivity measured after this process is indeed the 'real' value of conductivity because of 'dissolved' impurities after eliminating the dissolved gases. Degas columns are designed inline with ASTM D4519 Standard. These measurements are also recommended in standards like ASME PTC 19.11-2008 and VGB S006 -00 2012_09_EN. You can also refer IAPWS guidelines for more information.
4. These Three conductivity measurement are very important and also used to calculate pH and dissolved CO_{2} values in steam and water cycles.

=== Online pH Measurement ===
pH measurement is also very basic yet very critical measurement for steam and water cycle. Monitoring the pH value of the feed water gives direct indication of alkalinity or acidity of this water. The ultra pure water has pH value of 7. In steam circuit it is normal practice to keep the pH value of feed water at slightly alkaline levels using chemical dosing. This helps in preventing the corrosion of pipe work and other equipment.

Typical points in the steam circuit where pH should be monitored are : Drum water, High pressure heaters, Make-up condensate, Plant effluent, Condenser, Cooling water.

=== Online Dissolved Oxygen Measurement ===
In Steam and Water Circuit temperature of water is increased from room temperature to superheated steam temperatures. In temperature range of 200to 250°C (feed water), dissolved oxygen causes corrosion of components and piping. Iron reacts with dissolved oxygen in feed water circuit resulting pitting may eventually cause puncturing and failures of Parts in Steam water circuits. Parts like condensers, Low Pressure Heaters (LPH), Feed water tanks, High pressure Heaters and Economizers need to be protected from dissolved oxygen attack. Dissolved oxygen also promotes electrolytic action between dissimilar metals causing corrosion and leakage at joints and gaskets.

In power plants various feed water treatments like

(1) All Volatile Treatment (AVT-R or AVT-O)

(2) Oxygenated Treatment (OT)

(3) Combine Water Treatment (CWT) are adopted to minimize corrosion.

Thus it is very important and critical to monitor and control Dissolved oxygen and pH values in Feed water systems. The typical points in steam circuit where dissolved oxygen monitoring is required are. Condenser outlet, L.P. heaters, Economizer inlet.

=== Online Hydrazine (Oxygen Scavenger) Measurement ===
In All Volatile Treatment-Reducing (AVT-R) treatment chemicals Like Hydrazine/ Carbohydrazine or DEHA are dosed in Boiler feed water. Such treatments are used for Steam water circuits with mixed metallurgy. These Chemicals act as an oxygen scavenger and a source of feed water alkalinity has well known advantages e.g. :

a) It prevents foaming and carryovers from boiler.

b) It minimizes deposits on metal surfaces.

c) Reduce Dissolved oxygen corrosion

In addition to its oxygen-scavenging function, hydrazine helps to maintain a protective magnetite layer over steel surfaces, and maintain feed water alkalinity to prevent acidic corrosion. The nominal dosage rate for hydrazine in feed water is about three times its oxygen level. Under dosing of hydrazine leads to increased corrosion; overdosing represents a costly waste. Monitoring the dissolved oxygen levels is not sufficient to control the optimum concentration because its provides no measure of any excess hydrazine.

The typical points in steam circuit where hydrazine monitoring is required are. Re-heaters, Economizer inlet, L.P. heaters.

=== Online Silica (SiO2--) Measurement ===
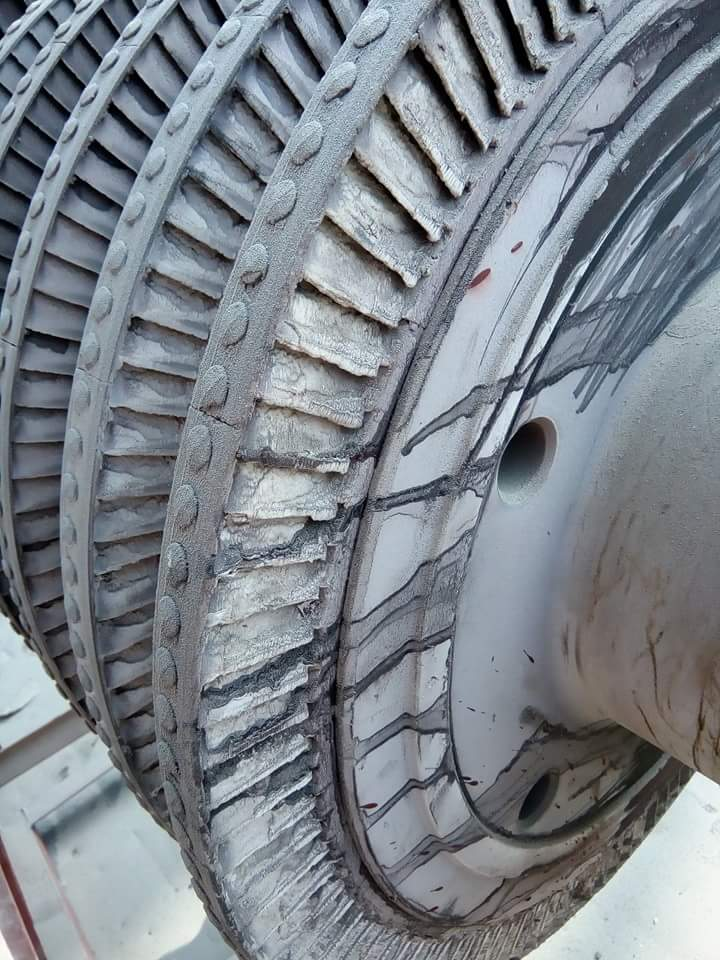
Silica Deposition on Steam Turbine Blades

When it comes to safety and efficiency of the steam turbine and boiler in a power plant, silica becomes one of the most critical factors to be monitored. Deposition of various impurities on turbine blades has been identified as one of the most common problems. Various compounds deposit on the turbine blades. Of all these compounds, silica (SiO2) deposits can occur at lower operating pressures also, Therefore, silica deposition is quite common in turbines than other types of deposits. Silica usually deposits in the intermediate-pressure and low-pressure sections of the turbine. These deposits are hard to remove, disturb the geometry of turbine blades and ultimately result in vibrations causing imbalance and loss of output from turbine.

Another important area of concern as far as silica deposition is concerned is boiler tube. Silica scale is one of the hardest scale to remove. Because of its low thermal conductivity, a very thin silica deposit can reduce heat transfer considerably, reducing efficiency, leading to hot spots and ultimately ruptures.

Because of all these issues, it is extremely important to closely monitor silica levels by using on-line silica analyzers that can measure silica levels to a ppb (parts per billion) level.

=== Online Sodium (Na+) Ion measurement ===
Sodium Measurement is one of the most critical measurement in Steam and Water Cycle for leak detections in circuit. The measurement of sodium is recognized - among other chemical parameters - as an effective telltale to reveal the condition of a high-purity water/steam circuit. The presence of sodium signals contamination with potentially corrosive anions, e.g. chlorides, sulfates etc. Under conditions of high pressure and temperature, neutral sodium salts exhibit considerable steam solubility. NaCl and NaOH, in particular, are known to be associated with stress corrosion cracking of boiler and super heater tubes. The measurement of sodium, acting as a carrier of potentially corrosive anions, is now recognized as an effective means to monitor steam purity.

DM Water after Cation and Mixed bed: Sampling after cation exchange is one of the most important parameters in trace sodium monitoring because it rapidly alerts the operator about resin bed exhaustion. Sodium measurement is particularly valuable in plants cooled by saline waters, especially if there is a high risk of condenser leakage and no provision for condensate polishing. Consequently, while small leaks may be extremely difficult to locate and eliminate, their detection and escalation is most readily monitored by sodium measurement. SWAN's sodium analyzers can detect up to 0.001 ppb or 1 ppt of trace sodium in water treatment facilities. This sensitivity allows operators to follow trend changes before any leakage requires immediate action. Additionally, this advantage can be converted over time to analyze the origin of the leakage and to plan either a production reduction, or even to stop production far enough in advance to avoid costly and unexpected emergency shut downs.

Boiler: Solid conditioning agents, such as Tri-sodium phosphate (TSP) and sodium hydroxide (Caustic) used for boiler drum water treatment. In case these chemicals are carried over with steam, They may cause deposits in the turbine and therefore need to be considered as potentially corrosive impurities.

Steam: Sodium is also measured in power plant water and steam samples because it is a common corrosive contaminant and can be detected at very low concentrations in the presence of higher amounts of ammonia and/or amine treatment which have a relatively high background conductivity. Steam purity can be more accurately assessed by measuring sodium concentration in both steam and condensate, thus determining the “sodium balance”. The two concentrations should be equal. A higher level of sodium in the condensate indicates a condenser leakage. A lower level of sodium in the condensate indicates deposition of sodium in the steam circuit.

Condensate: Sodium measurement should be the preferred option for early warnings of leakages of impurities in condensates. It also plays key role in Condensate Polishing plant controls.

=== Online Phosphate Measurement in Boiler Drum Water ===
Phosphate measurement is important only for Drum Type boilers. Solid conditioning agents, such as Tri-sodium phosphate (TSP) are widely used as a dosing chemical in Boiler Drums. In case of excess dosing of these chemicals can lead to issues like Foaming, Carry over of salts to Steam. Controlling dosing of phosphate under variable steam loads is challenging task mainly because of Phosphate hideouts. Thus mainly users preferred Phosphate measurement in Drum water samples

== See also ==
- Boiler (power generation)
- Supercritical steam generator
