= Recrystallization (chemistry) =

Separation and purification process of crystalline solids

Recrystallization is a broad class of chemical purification techniques characterized by the dissolution of an impure sample in a solvent or solvent mixture, followed by some change in conditions that encourages the formation of pure isolate as solid crystals. Recrystallization as a purification technique is driven by spontaneous processes of self-assembly that leverage the highly ordered (i.e. low-entropy) and periodic characteristics of a crystal's molecular structure to produce purification.

== Basic principles ==
The driving force of this purification emerges from the difference in molecular interactions between the isolate and the impurities: if a molecule of the desired isolate interacts with any isolate crystal present, it is likely the molecule deposits on the crystal's ordered surface and contributes to the crystal's growth; if a molecule of the impurity interacts with any isolate crystal present, it is unlikely to deposit on the crystal's ordered surface, and thus stays dissolved in the solvent. Initial crystals of isolate form by processes of stochastic nucleation and grow to macroscopic sizes when isolate molecules in solution deposit on them.

The simplest example of recrystallization is by temperature manipulation of a solution where the isolate compound has an endothermic dissolution (ΔH > 0) and a solubility product K_{sp} that increases with temperature. A saturated solution of the impure sample (usually in a disordered state of matter, such as a solid powder or a viscous liquid) is prepared near or at the boiling point of the solvent, and then the solution is slowly cooled to form a supersaturated solution where crystal nucleation (and thus formation) is imminent.

== Methods ==
The importance of crystallized compounds is so great that considerable effort and many reports describe methods for crystallization. Among the more popular methods are:

- slow evaporation
- slow cooling
- solvent layering
- mixed evaporation
- Vapor diffusion

In a simple case, solution of a solid is cooled to below the stage of saturation. In some cases, the solution is prepared with a hot solvent. In some cases, a mixed solvent is employed, for example aqueous ethanol. Some of the solute will crystallize upon cooling. Ideally the precipitate will be absent some or most of impurities, which are more soluble in the solvent.

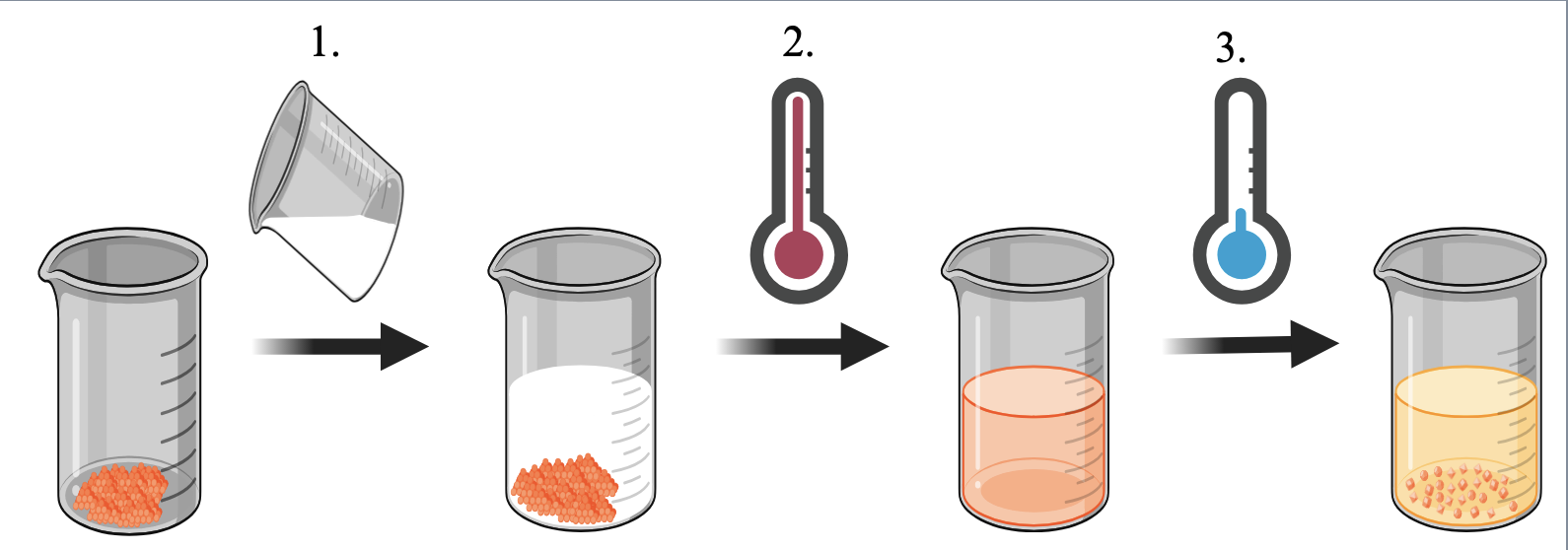
A solvent (white) is added to a compound (orange). The slurry is heated to give a solution (orange). The solution is allowed to cool, ideally yielding crystals (orange), leaving impurities in solution (pale-orange).

Two solvent recrystallization relies on the product being far more soluble in one solvent than a second solvent, which is called the antisolvent. The solvent and antisolvent must be miscible. The volume ratio between the solvent and antisolvent is important as well as the concentration of the sample. The antisolvent is added to the solution of the solute until incipient precipitation of the solid. The solution is then cooled or simply allowed stand to further induce further crystallization. In one variation of this method, the solution is layered with the antisolvent.

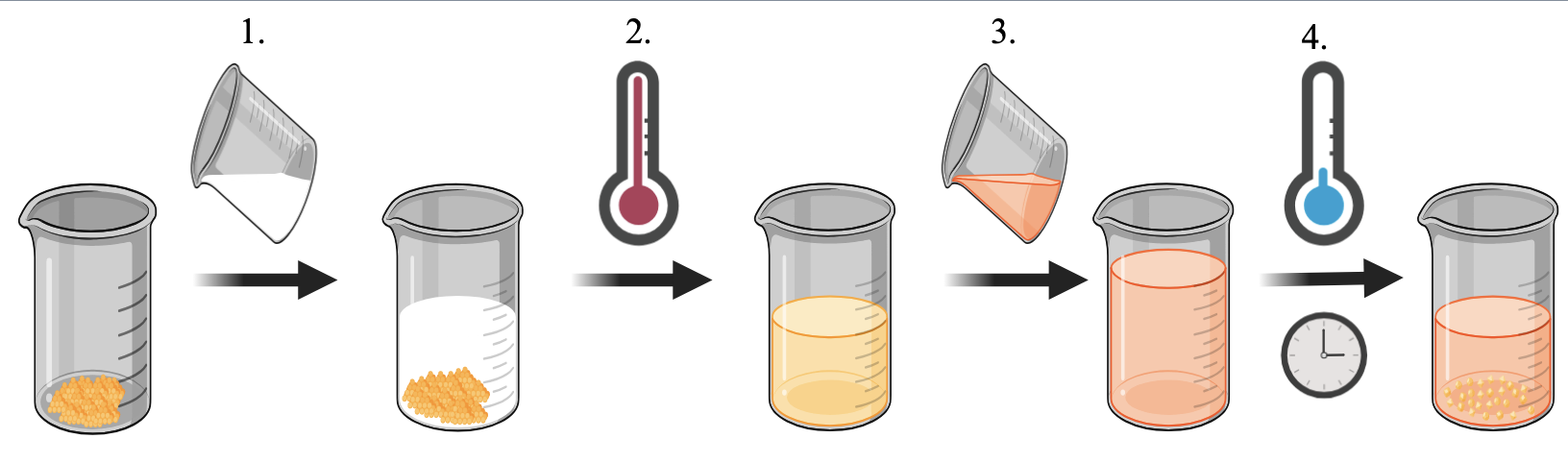
An antisolvent (orange) is added to a solution (light orange) of the targeted compound. Cooling over time can yield crystals (light orange).

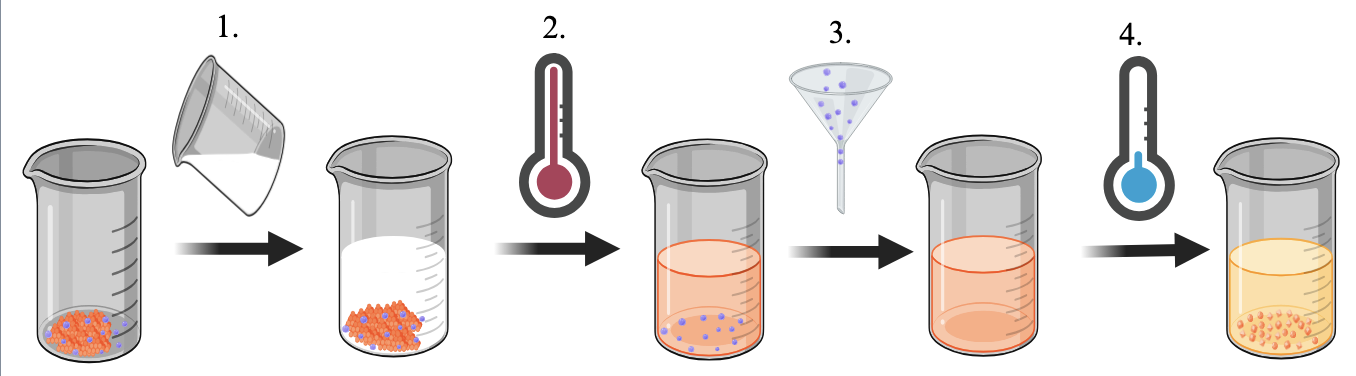
A solvent is added (white) to a mixture of a compound (orange) and insoluble substance (purple) → Solvent is heated to give a saturated compound solution (orange) and an insoluble substance (purple) → Saturated compound solution (orange) is filtered to remove the insoluble substance (purple) → Saturated compound solution (orange) is allowed to cool over time yielding crystals (orange) as separate from an impure solution (pale-orange).

== X-ray analysis ==
Recrystallized products are often subject to X-ray crystallography for purity assessment. The technique requires crystallized products to be singular, and absent of clumps. Several approaches to this phenomenon are listed below.

- Slow evaporation of a single solvent - typically the compound is dissolved in a suitable solvent and the solvent is allowed to slowly evaporate. Once the solution is saturated crystals can be formed.

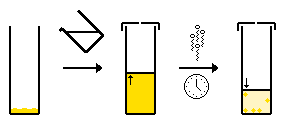
→ Solvent added (clear) to compound (orange) to give compound solution (orange) → Vessel sealed but a small hole allows solvent vapour (clear) to slowly evaporate from compound solution (orange) over time to give crystals (orange) and a saturated solution (pale-orange).

- Slow evaporation of a multi-solvent system - the same as above, however as the solvent composition changes due to evaporation of the more volatile solvent. The compound is more soluble in the volatile solvent, and so the compound becomes increasingly insoluble in solution and crystallizes.

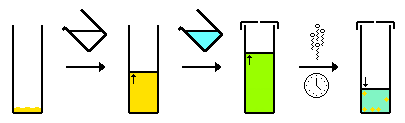
→ Solvent added (clear) to compound (orange) to give compound solution (orange) → The second solvent added (blue) to the compound solution (orange) to give mixed solvent system (green) → Vessel sealed but a small hole allows solvent vapour (clear) to slowly evaporate over time to give crystals (orange) and a saturated mixed solvent solution (blue-green).

- Slow diffusion - similar to the above. However, a second solvent is allowed to evaporate from one container into a container holding the compound solution (gas diffusion). As the solvent composition changes due to an increase in the solvent that has gas diffused into the solution, the compound becomes increasingly insoluble in the solution and crystallizes.

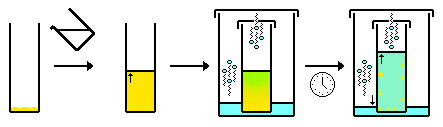
→ Solvent added (clear) to compound (orange) in the first vessel to give compound solution (orange) → The first vessel is placed in a second vessel contain second solvent (blue). The second vessel is sealed, and the first vessel is also sealed, although a small hole in the first vessel is present. This hole allows volatile solvent vapour (blue) to slowly evaporate from the second vessel and condensate (that is infuse) into the first vessel, to give a mixed solvent system (green) → Over time this gives crystals (orange) and a saturated mixed solvent system (green-blue).

- Interface/slow mixing (often performed in an NMR tube). Similar to the above, but instead of one solvent gas-diffusing into another, the two solvents mix (diffuse) by liquid-liquid diffusion. Typically a second solvent is "layered" carefully on top of the solution containing the compound. Over time the two solution mix. As the solvent composition changes due to diffusion, the compound becomes increasingly insoluble in solution and crystallizes, usually at the interface. Additionally, it is better to use a denser solvent as the lower layer, and/or a hotter solvent as the upper layer because this results in the slower mixing of the solvents.

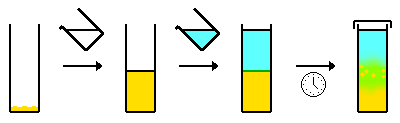
→ Solvent added (clear) to compound (orange) to give compound solution (orange) → The second solvent added (blue) carefully so that the two solvents do not mix. → The two solvents mix (diffuse) slowly over time to give crystals (orange) at the solvent interface (green)

- Specialized equipment can be used in the shape of an "H" to perform the above, where one of the vertical lines of the "H" is a tube containing a solution of the compound, and the other vertical line of the "H" is a tube containing a solvent which the compound is not soluble in, and the horizontal line of the "H" is a tube which joins the two vertical tubes, which also has a fine glass sinter that restricts the mixing of the two solvents.

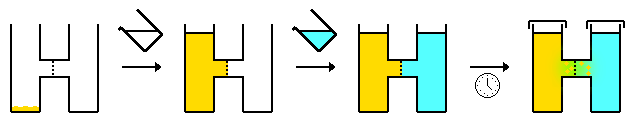
→ Solvent added (clear) to compound (orange) to give a compound solution (orange) → The second solvent added (blue) to the second tube chamber → The two solvents mix slowly over time, the mixing is slowed by a fine sinter separating the two solvent chambers, to give crystals (orange) at the solvent interface (green) over time

- Once single perfect crystals have been obtained, it is recommended that the crystals are kept in a sealed vessel with some of the liquid of crystallization to prevent the crystal from 'drying out'. Single perfect crystals may contain solvent of crystallization in the crystal lattice. Loss of this internal solvent from the crystals can result in the crystal lattice breaking down, and the crystals turning to powder.

== See also ==
- Crystal structure
- Nucleation
- Fractional crystallization (chemistry)
