= Calcium hydroxide (data page) =

Chemical data page

This page provides supplementary chemical data on calcium hydroxide.

== Material Safety Data Sheet ==
The handling of this chemical may incur notable safety precautions. It is highly recommend that you seek the Material Safety Datasheet (MSDS) for this chemical from a reliable source and follow its directions.

- SIRI
- Science Stuff

== Thermodynamic properties ==
Solid properties
Std enthalpy change of formation, Δ_{f}H^{~~o~~}_{solid}	-985.2 kJ/mol
Standard molar entropy, S^{~~o~~}_{solid}	83.4 J/(mol K)
