= In vivo supersaturation =

Behavior of orally administered compounds

In vivo supersaturation is the behavior of orally administered compounds that undergo supersaturation as they pass through the gastrointestinal (GI) tract. Typically these compounds have a weakly basic nature (pK_{a} in the range of 5 to 8) and a relatively low solubility in aqueous solutions. In vivo supersaturation is a recent phenomenon that was first observed by Yamashita et al. in 2003.
