= Common-ion effect =

Decrease in solubility of an ionic substance in solution when a common ion is added

In chemistry, the common-ion effect refers to the decrease in solubility of an ionic precipitate by the addition to the solution of a soluble compound with an ion in common with the precipitate. This behaviour is a consequence of Le Chatelier's principle for the equilibrium reaction of the ionic association/dissociation. The effect is commonly seen as an effect on the solubility of salts and other weak electrolytes. Adding an additional amount of one of the ions of the salt generally leads to increased precipitation of the salt, which reduces the concentration of both ions of the salt until the solubility equilibrium is reached. The effect is based on the fact that both the original salt and the other added chemical have one ion in common with each other.

== Examples of the common-ion effect ==
=== Dissociation of hydrogen sulfide in presence of hydrochloric acid ===
Hydrogen sulfide (H_{2}S) is a weak electrolyte. It is partially ionized when in aqueous solution, therefore there exists an equilibrium between un-ionized molecules and constituent ions in an aqueous medium as follows:

H_{2}S ⇌ H^{+} + HS^{−}

By applying the law of mass action, we have

$$K_\ce{a}=\frac{[\text{H}^+] [\text{HS}^{-}]} {[\text{H}_2\text{S}]}$$

Hydrochloric acid (HCl) is a strong electrolyte, which nearly completely ionizes as

HCl → H^{+} + Cl^{−}

If HCl is added to the H_{2}S solution, H^{+} is a common ion and creates a common ion effect. Due to the increase in concentration of H^{+} ions from the added HCl, the equilibrium of the dissociation of H_{2}S shifts to the left and keeps the value of K_{a} constant. Thus the dissociation of H_{2}S decreases, the concentration of un-ionized H_{2}S increases, and as a result, the concentration of sulfide ions decreases.

=== Solubility of barium iodate in presence of barium nitrate ===
Barium iodate, Ba(IO_{3})_{2}, has a solubility product K_{sp} = [Ba^{2+}][IO_{3}^{−}]^{2} = 1.57 × 10^{−9}. Its solubility in pure water is 7.32 × 10^{−4} M. However in a solution that is 0.0200 M in barium nitrate, Ba(NO_{3})_{2}, the increase in the common ion barium leads to a decrease in iodate ion concentration. The solubility is therefore reduced to 1.40 × 10^{−4} M, about five times smaller.

== Solubility effects ==
A practical example used very widely in areas drawing drinking water from chalk or limestone aquifers is the addition of sodium carbonate to the raw water to reduce the hardness of the water. In the water treatment process, highly soluble sodium carbonate salt is added to precipitate out sparingly soluble calcium carbonate. The very pure and finely divided precipitate of calcium carbonate that is generated is a valuable by-product used in the manufacture of toothpaste.

The salting-out process used in the manufacture of soaps benefits from the common-ion effect. Soaps are sodium salts of fatty acids. Addition of sodium chloride reduces the solubility of the soap salts. The soaps precipitate due to a combination of common-ion effect and increased ionic strength.

Sea, brackish and other waters that contain appreciable amount of sodium ions (Na^{+}) interfere with the normal behavior of soap because of common-ion effect. In the presence of excess Na^{+}, the solubility of soap salts is reduced, making the soap less effective.

== Buffering effect ==
A buffer solution contains an acid and its conjugate base or a base and its conjugate acid. Addition of the conjugate ion will result in a change of pH of the buffer solution. For example, if both sodium acetate and acetic acid are dissolved in the same solution they both dissociate and ionize to produce acetate ions. Sodium acetate is a strong electrolyte, so it dissociates completely in solution. Acetic acid is a weak acid, so it only ionizes slightly. According to Le Chatelier's principle, the addition of acetate ions from sodium acetate will suppress the ionization of acetic acid and shift its equilibrium to the left. Thus the percent dissociation of the acetic acid will decrease, and the pH of the solution will increase. The ionization of an acid or a base is limited by the presence of its conjugate base or acid.

NaCH_{3}CO_{2}(s) → Na^{+}(aq) + CH_{3}CO_{2}^{−}(aq)

CH_{3}CO_{2}H(aq) ⇌ H^{+}(aq) + CH_{3}CO_{2}^{−}(aq)

This will decrease the hydronium concentration, and thus the common-ion solution will be less acidic than a solution containing only acetic acid.

== Exceptions ==
Many transition-metal compounds violate this rule due to the formation of complex ions, a scenario not part of the equilibria that are involved in simple precipitation of salts from ionic solution. For example, copper(I) chloride is insoluble in water, but it dissolves when chloride ions are added, such as when hydrochloric acid is added. This is due to the formation of soluble CuCl_{2}^{−} complex ions.

== Uncommon-ion effect ==
Sometimes adding an ion other than the ones that are part of the precipitated salt itself can increase the solubility of the salt. This "salting in" is called the "uncommon-ion effect" (also "salt effect" or the "diverse-ion effect"). It occurs because as the total ion concentration increases, inter-ion attraction within the solution can become an important factor. This alternate equilibrium makes the ions less available for the precipitation reaction. This is also called odd ion effect.
