= International Association for the Properties of Water and Steam =

The International Association for the Properties of Water and Steam (IAPWS) is an international non-profit association of national organizations concerned with the properties of water and steam, particularly thermophysical properties and other aspects of high-temperature steam, water and aqueous mixtures that are relevant to thermal power cycles and other industrial applications.

The history of IAPWS dates back to the late 1920s when there was a collective need to develop a better understanding and standardization of the thermodynamic properties of steam to improve the design and performance of steam engines and steam turbines that were being used in transport, factories and electricity production.

The organization publishes a range of 'releases'. Specifically, these relate to the thermal and expansion properties of steam. Both free software and commercial software implementations of the IAPWS correlations are available.
