= Melt (manufacturing) =

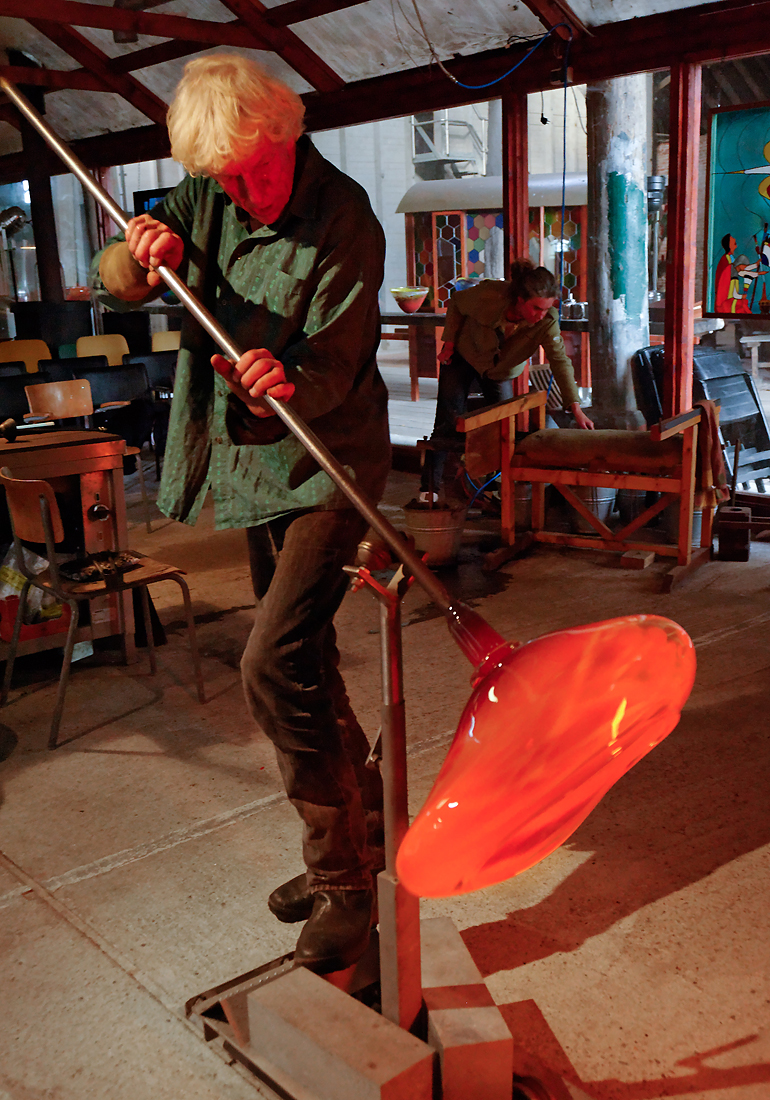
Melted glass processing

Melt is the working material in the steelmaking process, in making glass, and when forming thermoplastics. In thermoplastics, melt is the plastic in its forming temperature, which can vary depending on how it is being used. For steelmaking, it refers to steel in liquid form.

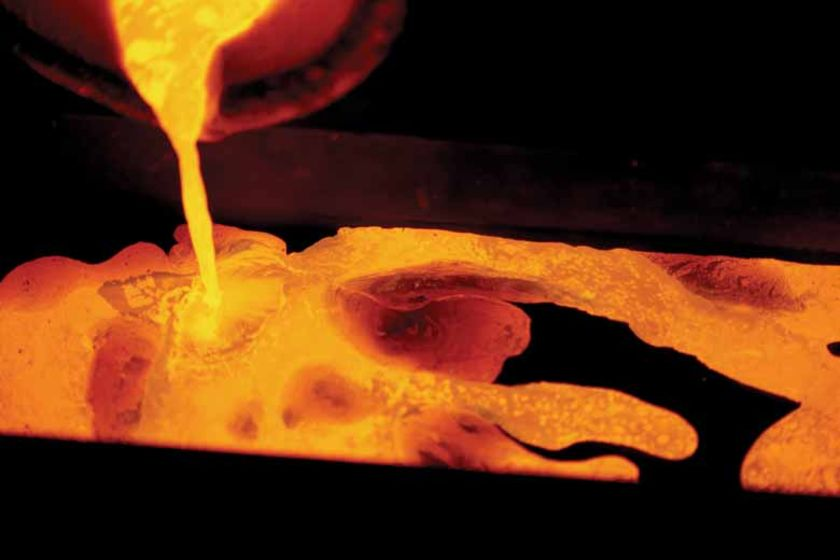
Pouring of gold melt

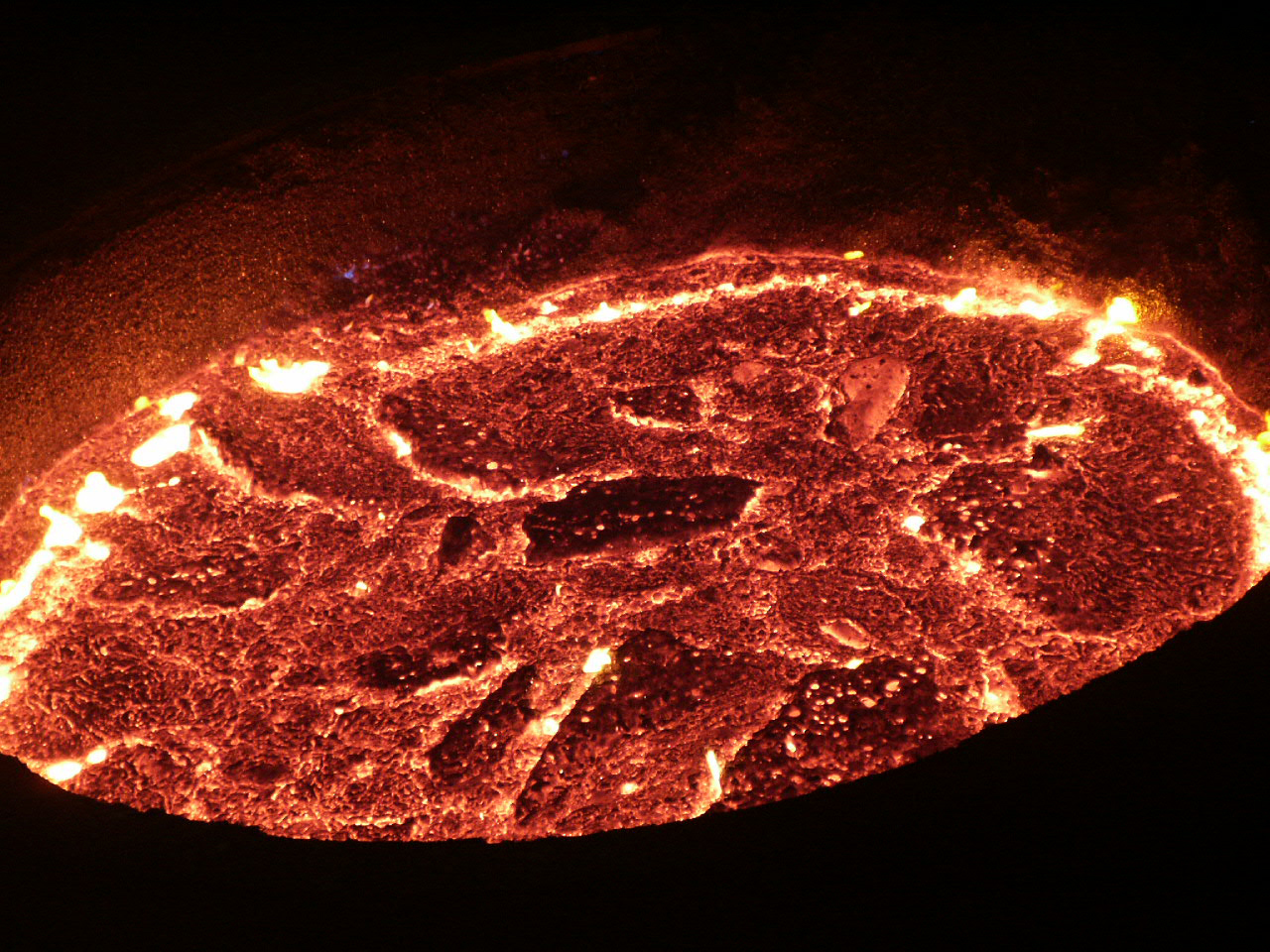
Raw iron melt

== See also ==
- Wax melter
- Crucible
