= Mullite =

Nesosilicate mineral

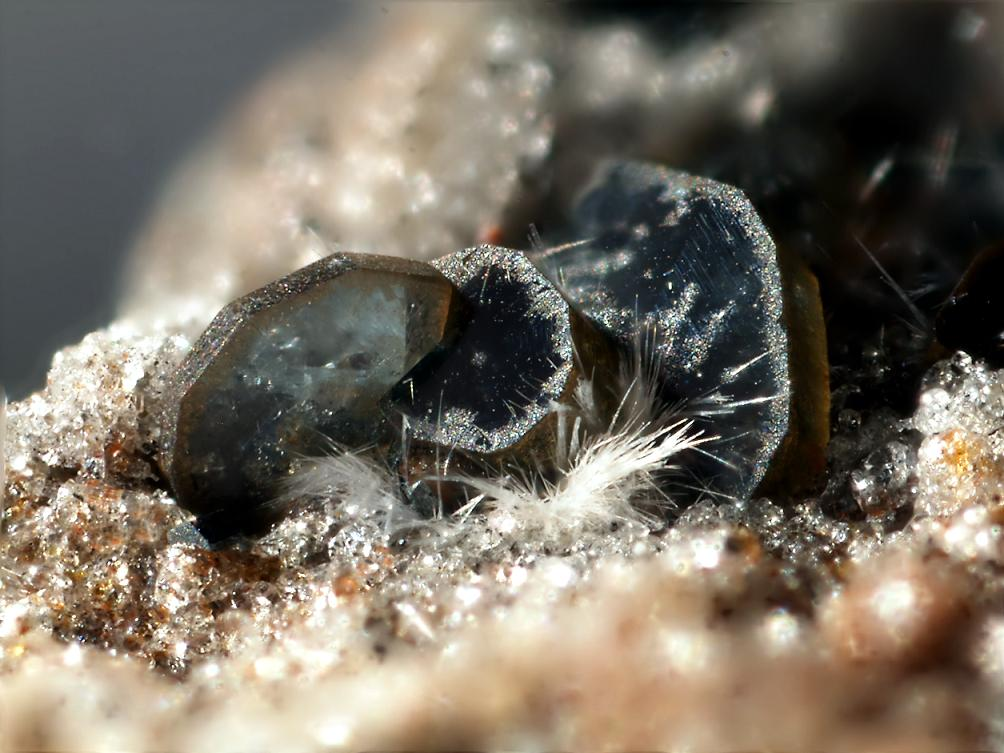
- White, filamentous mullite in front of thicker osumilite platelets (Photo width 1.5 mm); Found in Wannenköpfe, Ochtendung, Eifel, Germany

General
- Category: Nesosilicate
- Formula: Al_{6}Si_{2}O_{13}
- IMA symbol: Mul
- Strunz classification: 9.AF.20
- Crystal system: Orthorhombic
- Crystal class: Dipyramidal (mmm); H-M symbol: (2/m 2/m 2/m)
- Space group: Pbnm, Pnnm
- Unit cell: a = 7.5785(6) Å, b = 7.6817(7) Å, c = 2.8864(3) Å; Z = 1

Identification
- Color: Colorless to pale pink or grey
- Crystal habit: Prismatic to acicular crystals
- Cleavage: Good on [010]
- Optical properties: Biaxial (+)
- Refractive index: n_{α} = 1.642–1.653 n_{β} = 1.644–1.655 n_{γ} = 1.654–1.679
- Birefringence: δ = 0.012–0.026
- 2V angle: Measured: 20° to 50°

Mullite or porcelainite is a rare silicate mineral formed during contact metamorphism of clay minerals. It can form two stoichiometric forms: 3Al_{2}O_{3}2SiO_{2} or 2Al_{2}O_{3} SiO_{2}. Unusually, mullite has no charge-balancing cations present. As a result, there are three different aluminium sites: two distorted tetrahedral and one octahedral.

Mullite was first described in 1924 for an occurrence on the Isle of Mull, Scotland. It occurs as argillaceous inclusions in volcanic rocks in the Isle of Mull, inclusions in sillimanite within a tonalite at Val Sissone, Italy and with emerylike rocks in Argyllshire, Scotland.

== Porcellanite ==
Mullite (porcelainite) can be found as a constituent mineral in a type of thermally-metamorphosed rock called porcellanite.

== Use in porcelain ==
Mullite is present in the form of needles in porcelain.

It is produced during various melting and firing processes, and is used as a refractory material, because of its high melting point of 1840 °C.

In 2006 researchers at University College London and Cardiff University discovered that potters in the Hesse region of Germany since the late Middle Ages had used mullite in the manufacture of a type of crucible (known as Hessian crucibles), that were renowned for enabling alchemists to heat their crucibles to very high temperatures. The formula finally replicated in the above studies (using kaolinitic clay and then firing it at temperatures above 1100 °C) was kept a closely guarded secret by those crucible makers since the 15th century.

Mullite morphology is also important for its application. In this case, there are two common morphologies for mullite. One is a platelet shape with low aspect ratio and the second is a needle shape with high aspect ratio. If the needle shape mullite can form in a ceramic body during sintering, it has an effect on both the mechanical and physical properties by increasing the mechanical strength and thermal shock resistance. The most important condition relates to ceramic chemical composition. If the silica and alumina ratio with low basic materials such as sodium and calcium is adjusted, the needle shape mullite forms at about 1400 °C and the needles will interlock. This mechanical interlocking contributes to the high mechanical strength of porcelain.

== Use as a catalyst ==
Further recent research indicates that a synthetic analogue of mullite can be an effective replacement for platinum in diesel engines for exhaust management.
