= Thomas Hastings (colonist) =

New England settler (1605–1685)

Member, General Court of Massachusetts
- In office 1673–1673

Personal details
- Born: c. 1605 England
- Died: c. September 15, 1685 (aged 80) Watertown, Massachusetts
- Spouse: Susan(na) _____ (1600-1650) Magaret Cheney (1628-c1690)
- Profession: Farmer, Deacon, Public Official

Thomas Hastings (c. 1605 – c. September 15, 1685) was a prominent English settler in New England, one of the approximately 20,000 immigrants who came as part of the Great Migration. A deacon of the church, among his many public offices he served on the Committee of Colony Assessments in 1640 and as Deputy for Watertown to the General Court of Massachusetts in 1673. He held property in nearby Dedham between 1636 and 1639, although there is no evidence that he ever lived there.

== Background and family ==
Hastings and his wife Susan left Ipswich, Suffolk, on The Elizabeth on April 30, 1634. Although his home in England is unknown, the make-up of their ship's company strongly suggests that he was from East Anglia and perhaps from the counties of Suffolk or Norfolk.

The only major genealogy to treat the family, The Hastings Memorial (Boston, 1866), states that he was of noble birth by descent from the illustrious family that included the Earl of Huntingdon line. He is not known to have claimed such a connection in his lifetime and there is no record to substantiate this supposed connection and much to argue against it. The surname is generally habitational and may derive from the English town of Hastings, Sussex.

After the death of his first wife in 1650, Hastings married Margaret Cheney of Roxbury and together they had eight children. Remarkably for the day and given such a large brood, they all survived their parents.

In 1671, their 19-year-old first son, Thomas Jr., was accused of fathering a child out of wedlock and the Hastings and Woodward families (who came to America together on the same ship 37 years before) became embroiled in a highly embarrassing paternity suit before the Middlesex County Court. Intimate relations outside of marriage were not simply frowned upon but potentially criminal. The social and political ramifications were foreboding too for Deacon Thomas, who was not only a leader in the church but serving as a selectman, town clerk and town meeting moderator during the controversy. While the younger Thomas denied the relationship and asserted another was the father, Susannah Woodward was quite forthright about their alleged liaisons and "for all of which miscarriages ... she craved forgiveness." Although paternity could not be established, circumstantial evidence and hearsay led to an order that Thomas Jr., pay for maintenance of the child and his father assumed the financial responsibility. Then, like today, his father's standing in the community brought relative leniency.

The younger Thomas married Anna Hawkes a year later after moving 150 miles west to the Connecticut River Valley and settling in the village of Hatfield, Massachusetts. He became a respected doctor which must have been a relief to his father who was to say later, "I have been at great charge to bring him up to be a Scholar and I hope he will live well by his arts and learning." Dr. Thomas practiced medicine for some 40 years and served as town clerk for two decades. His was a frontier practice and as such, he treated many injuries sustained in skirmishes with the Indians and also wrote one of the best contemporary records of the devastating 1704 attack on nearby Deerfield.

== Legacy ==
In Watertown, Massachusetts, where the American town meeting first took form, Thomas Hastings was repeatedly called to leadership positions inside and outside the church. At one time or another, he held virtually every office to include multiple stints as Selectman, Moderator and Town Clerk. His public service spanned five decades and he was last elected to public office (Selectman) in 1680. As a Freeman, he owned property and would have been a devoted Puritan and believer of the Gospel as conveyed in the Geneva Bible. Certainly one of the town's most influential citizens, later historians have called him one of the "old war-horses" of Watertown. Many of the surviving records from his time were written in his hand and often the government meetings were held in his home.

The descendants of Thomas & Margaret are numerous and many have risen to positions of great importance or notoriety. Although no marker remains, he almost certainly lies among his many descendants in Watertown's Old Burying Ground (Arlington St. Cemetery). Margaret Hastings survived him by about five years. The old property locations are well established, but no 17th-century Hastings family structures remain.

Grandsons of Thomas Hastings, Daniel and Nathaniel Hastings were among the early settlers of the Town of Boylston, Massachusetts.

== Some notable descendants ==
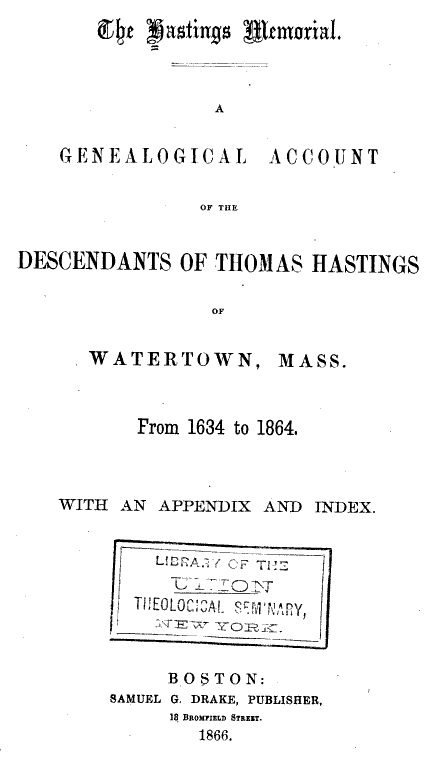
Frontispiece, The Hastings Memorial, Lydia Nelson Hastings Buckminster, Boston, 1866

- Herbert Baxter Adams
- Dorthea Dix Allen
- Lemuel H. Arnold
- Frederick H. Billings
- George R. Carter
- Frederick Spaulding Coolidge
- Marcus A. Coolidge
- Kirtland Kelsey Cutter
- Daniel Ashley Dickinson (1839–1902) (Associate Justice of the Minnesota Supreme Court)
- Frank Austin Gooch
- F. Childe Hassam
- Lansford Hastings
- W. Reed Hastings
- Robert Hastings, attorney, co-founder, Paul, Hastings, Janofsky & Walker
- Seth Hastings
- Smith H. Hastings (1843–1905) (Union Colonel and Medal of Honor winner)
- Solon S. Hastings (1806–aft. 1864) (Massachusetts legislator)
- Thomas Hastings (architect)
- Thomas Hastings (composer)
- Thomas Nelson Hastings (1858–1907) (Member of New Hampshire Senate and friend of Thomas A. Edison)
- Wells Southworth Hastings (1878–1923) (author)
- William Soden Hastings
- William Jefferson Hunsaker, (1855–1933), San Diego County District Attorney, 4th mayor of San Diego, California Bar Association president
- Susanna Willard Johnson (1730–1810) (Indian captive and noted diarist)
- Albert Francis Judd
- Gerrit P. Judd
- Lawrence Judd
- L. Brooks Leavitt
- Anne Morrow Lindbergh
- Carole Lombard
- Kimo Wilder McVay
- James Richard Mead
- Barse Miller (1904–1973) (accomplished California painter/water colorist)
- Warren Hastings Miller (1876–1960) (Author; editor of Field & Stream magazine)
- E. H. Moore
- Eliakim H. Moore
- Theodore Parker
- Calvin Plimpton
- William Russell (1857–1896), 37th governor of Massachusetts
- Waitstill Sharp
- Daniel Willard
- Henry Wellesley Wild
- Mary Billings French Rockefeller (1910–1997)

== Bibliography ==
- Anderson, Robert A., The Great Migration, Immigrants to New England 1634-1635, Vol. III G-H, Boston: New England Historic Genealogical Society, 2003.
- Barker, Fred, Watertown Records Comprising The First and Second Books of Town Proceedings with the Land Grants and Possessions also The Proprietor's Book and The First Book and Supplement of Births Deaths and Marriages, Watertown: Historical Society (undated modern NEHGS photoduplication copy of 1894 edition).
- Bond, Dr. Henry, Genealogies of Watertown, Massachusetts, Boston: Higginson Book Company (undated modern reprint of 1860 edition).
- Buckminster, Lydia N.H., The Hastings Memorial, A Genealogical Account of the Descendants of Thomas Hastings of Watertown, Mass. from 1634 to 1864, Boston: Samuel G. Drake Publisher (an undated NEHGS photoduplicate of the 1866 edition).
- Coolidge, Emma D., Descendants of John & Mary Coolidge of Watertown, Massachusetts 1630, Boston: Wright & Potter, 1930
- Cross, Claire, The Puritan Earl, The Life of Henry Hastings, Third Earl of Huntingdon, 1536-1595, New York: St. Martin's Press, 1966.
- Faris, David, Plantagenet Ancestry of Seventeenth-Century Colonists, 2ed., Boston: New England Historic Genealogical Society, 1999.
- Fischer, David Hackett, Albion's Seed, Four British Folkways in America, New York: Oxford University Press, 1989.
- Judd IV, Gerrit P., Dr. Judd, Hawaii's friend, A biography of Gerrit Parmele Judd (1803–1873), Honolulu: University of Hawaii Press, 1960.
- Thompson, Roger, Divided We Stand, Watertown, Massachusetts, 1630-1680, Amherst: University of Massachusetts Press, 2001.
- Thompson, Roger, Mobility & Migration, East Anglian Founders of New England, 1629-1640, Amherst: University of Massachusetts Press, 1994.
- Thompson, Roger, Sex in Middlesex, Popular Mores in a Massachusetts County, 1649-1699, Amherst: University of Massachusetts Press, 1986.
