= Hessian crucible =

Metallurgical equipment

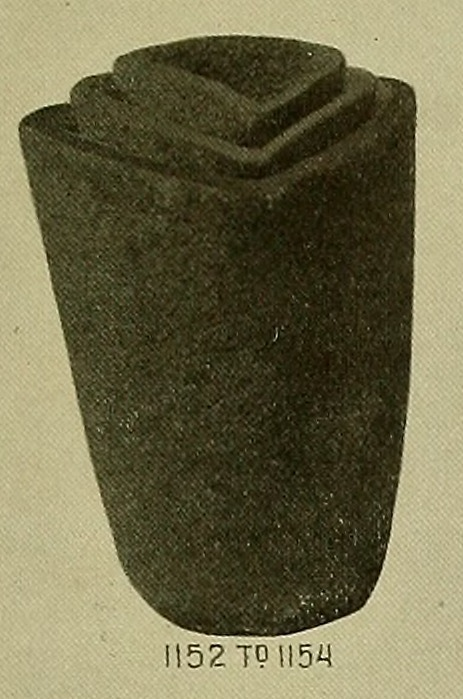
Set of three Hessian sand crucibles from an 1899 "catalogue of supplies for watchmakers, jewelers and kindred trades"

A Hessian crucible is a type of ceramic crucible that was manufactured in the Hesse region of Germany from the late Middle Ages through the Renaissance period. They were renowned for their ability to withstand very high temperatures, rapid changes in temperature, and strong reagents. These crucibles were widely used for alchemy and early metallurgy. Millions of the vessels were exported throughout Europe, Scandinavia, and the colonies in the Americas. The crucibles were made by firing kaolinitic clay at temperatures greater than 1100°C, forming mullite. Mullite is an aluminum silicate only described in the 20th century and is responsible for the excellent properties of the Hessian crucible. Main production centre of the Hessian crucibles was the village of Großalmerode.
