= Crucible =

Container in which substances are heated

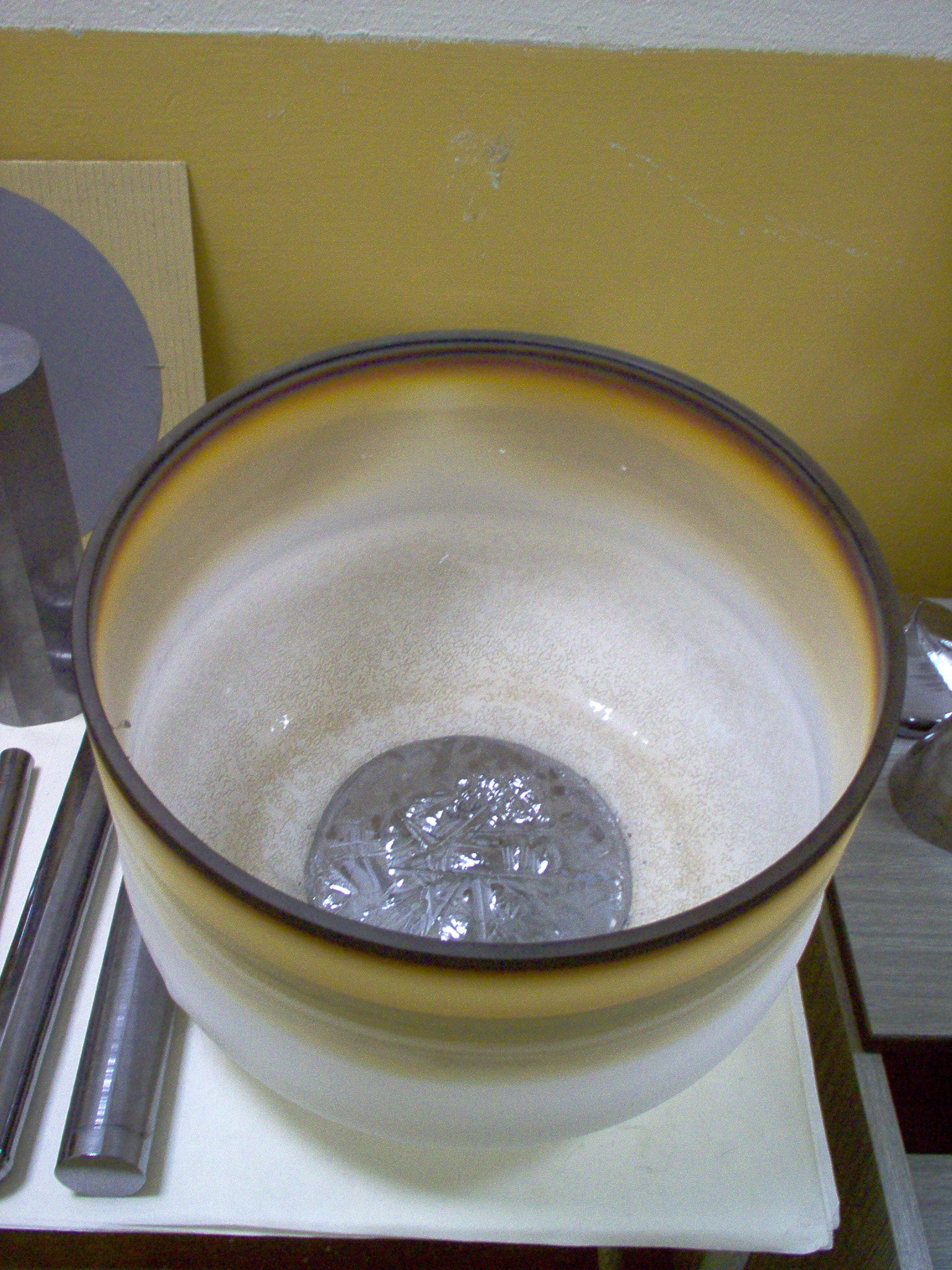
A modern crucible used in the production of silicon ingots via the Czochralski process

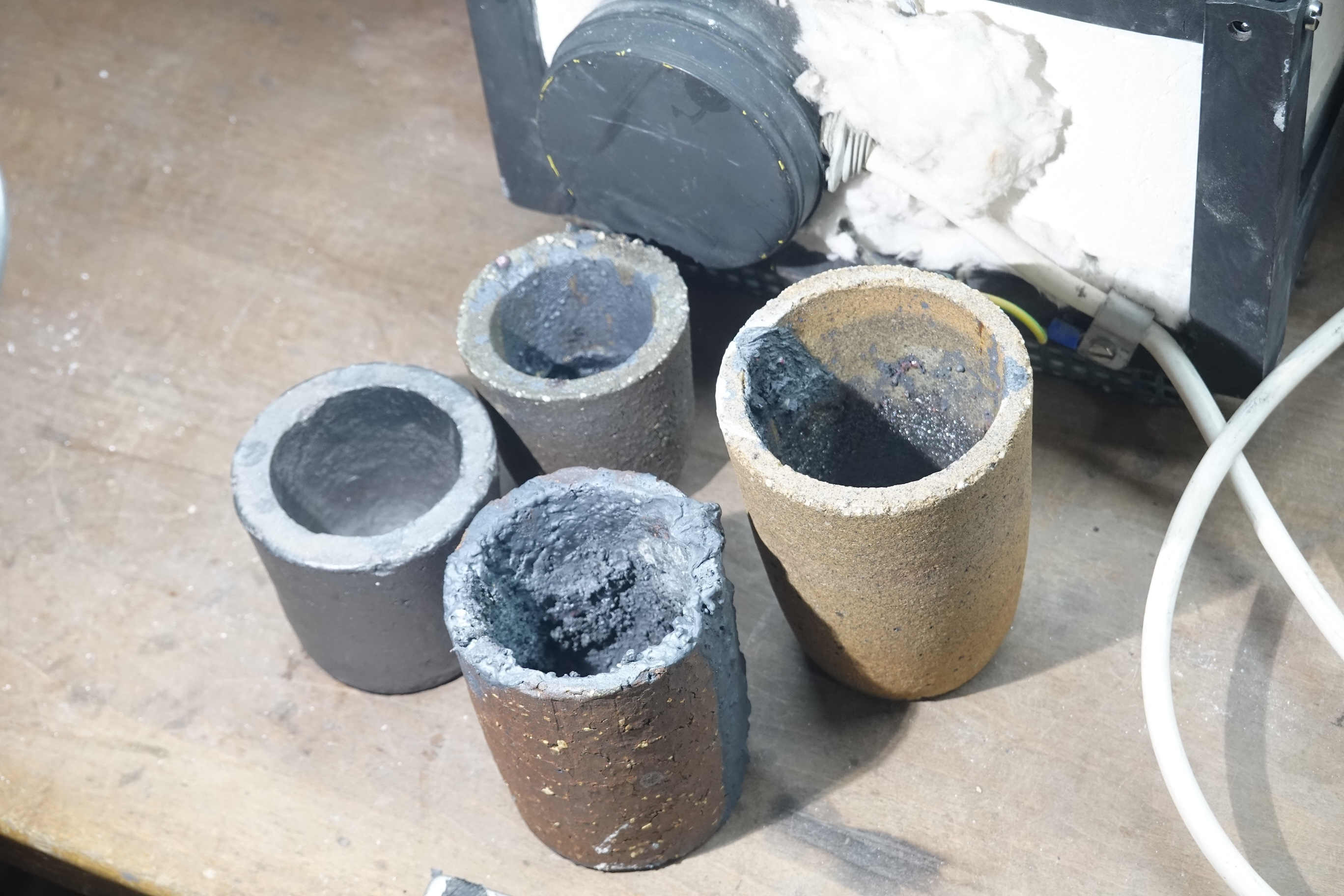
Smaller clay graphite crucibles for copper alloy melting

A crucible is a container in which metals or other substances are melted or subjected to very high temperatures. Although crucibles have historically tended to be made out of clay, they can be made from any material that withstands temperatures high enough to melt or otherwise alter its contents.

== History ==
=== Typology and chronology ===
The form of the crucible has varied through time, with designs reflecting the process for which they are used, as well as regional variation. The earliest crucible forms derive from the sixth/fifth millennium B.C. in Eastern Europe and Iran.

=== Chalcolithic ===
Crucibles used for copper smelting were generally wide shallow vessels made from clay that lacks refractory properties which is similar to the types of clay used in other ceramics of the time. During the Chalcolithic period, crucibles were heated from the top by using blowpipes. Ceramic crucibles from this time had slight modifications to their designs such as handles, knobs or pouring spouts allowing them to be more easily handled and poured. Early examples of this practice can be seen in Feinan, Jordan. These crucibles have added handles to allow for better manipulation, however, due to the poor preservation of the crucibles there is no evidence of a pouring spout. The main purpose of the crucible during this period was to keep the ore in the area where the heat was concentrated to separate it from impurities before shaping.

A crucible furnace dating to 2300–1900 BC for bronze casting has been found at a religious precinct of Kerma.

=== Iron Age ===
The use of crucibles in the Iron Age remains very similar to that of the Bronze Age with copper and tin smelting being used to produce bronze. The Iron Age crucible designs remain the same as the Bronze Age.

The Roman period shows technical innovations, with crucibles for new methods used to produce new alloys. The smelting and melting process also changed with both the heating technique and the crucible design. The crucible changed into rounded or pointed bottom vessels with a more conical shape; these were heated from below, unlike prehistoric types which were irregular in shape and were heated from above. These designs gave greater stability within the charcoal. These crucibles in some cases have thinner walls and have more refractory properties.

During the Roman period a new process of metalworking started, cementation, used in the production of brass. This process involves the combination of a metal and a gas to produce an alloy. Brass is made by mixing solid copper metal with zinc oxide or carbonate which comes in the form of calamine or smithsonite. This is heated to about 900 °C, the zinc oxide vaporizes into a gas, and the zinc gas bonds with the molten copper. This reaction has to take place in a part-closed or closed container otherwise the zinc vapor would escape before it can react with the copper. Cementation crucibles, therefore, have a lid or cap which limits the amount of gas loss from the crucible. The crucible design is similar to the smelting and melting crucibles of the period utilizing the same material as the smelting and melting crucibles. The conical shape and smallmouth allowed the lid to be added. These small crucibles are seen in Colonia Ulpia Trajana (modern-day Xanten), Germany, where the crucibles are around 4 cm in size, however, these are small examples. There are examples of larger vessels such as cooking pots and amphorae being used for cementation to process larger amounts of brass; since the reaction takes place at low temperatures lower fired ceramics could be used. The ceramic vessels which are used are important as the vessel must be able to lose gas through the walls otherwise the pressure would break the vessel. Cementation vessels are mass-produced due to crucibles having to be broken open to remove the brass once the reaction has finished as in most cases the lid would have baked hard to the vessel or the brass might have adhered to the vessel walls.

=== Medieval period ===
Smelting and melting of copper and its alloys such as leaded bronze was done in crucibles similar to those of the Roman period which have thinner walls and flat bases to sit within the furnaces. The technology for this type of smelting started to change at the end of the medieval period with the introduction of new tempering material for the ceramic crucibles. Some of these copper alloy crucibles were used in the making of bells. Bell foundry crucibles had to be larger at about 60 cm. These later medieval crucibles were a more mass-produced product.

The cementation process, which was lost from the end of the Roman to the early medieval period, continued in the same way with brass. Brass production increased during the medieval period due to a better understanding of the technology behind it. Furthermore, the process for carrying out cementation for brass did not change greatly until the 19th century.

However, during this period a vast and highly important technological innovation happened using the cementation process, the production of crucible steel. Steel production using iron and carbon works similarly to brass, with the iron metal being mixed with carbon to produce steel. The first examples of cementation steel are wootz steel from India, where the crucibles were filled with good quality low-carbon wrought iron and carbon in the form of organics such as leaves, wood, etc. However, no charcoal was used within the crucible. These early crucibles would only produce a small amount of steel as they would have to be broken once the process has finished.

By the late medieval period, steel production had moved from India to modern-day Uzbekistan, where new materials were being used in the production of steel crucibles; for example, Mullite crucibles were introduced. These were sandy clay crucibles which had been formed around a fabric tube. These crucibles were used in the same way as other cementation vessels but with a hole in the top of the vessel to allow pressure to escape.

=== Post-medieval ===
At the end of the medieval era and into the post-medieval era, new types of crucible designs and processes started. Smelting and melting crucibles types started to become more limited in designs which are produced by a few specialists. The main types used during the post-medieval period are the Hessian crucibles which were made in the Hesse region in Germany. These are triangular vessels made on a wheel or within a mold using high alumina clay and tempered with pure quartz sand. Furthermore, another specialized crucible which was made at the same time was that of a graphite crucible from southern Germany. These had a very similar design to that of the triangular crucibles from Hesse but they also occur in conical forms. These crucibles were traded all across Europe and the New World.

The refining of methods during the medieval and post-medieval periods led to the invention of the cupel which resembles a small egg cup, made of ceramic or bone ash which was used to separate base metals from noble metals. This process is known as cupellation. Cupellation started long before the post-medieval period; however, the first vessels made to carry out this process started in the 16th century. Another vessel used for the same process is a scorifier, which is similar to a cupel but slightly larger and removes the lead and leaves the noble metals behind. Cupels and scorifiers were mass-produced as after each reduction the vessels would have absorbed all of the lead and become fully saturated. These vessels were also used in the process of metallurgical assay where the noble metals are removed from a coin or a weight of metal to determine the amount of the noble metals within the object.

== Modern-day uses ==
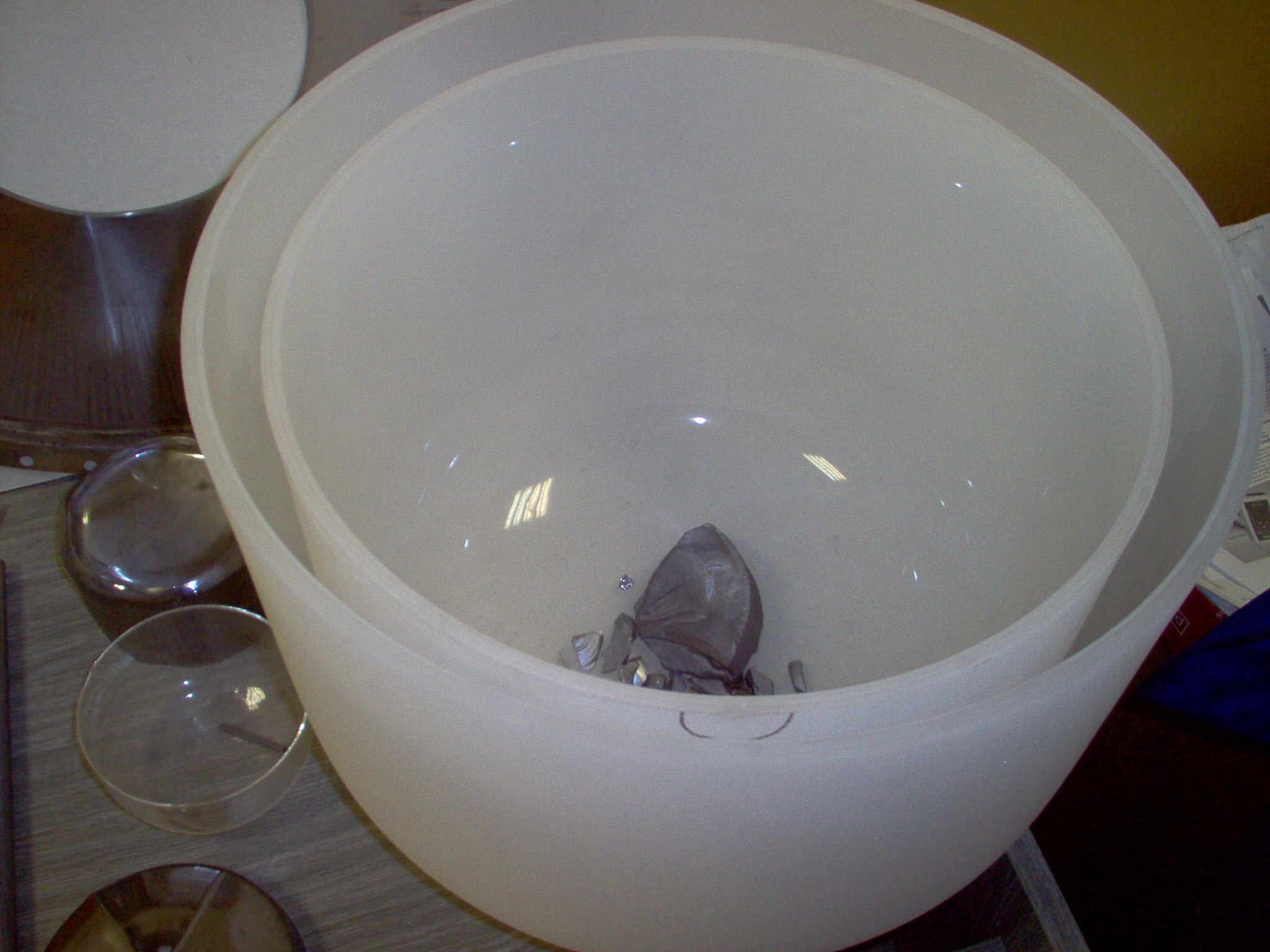
Crucibles used in Czochralski method

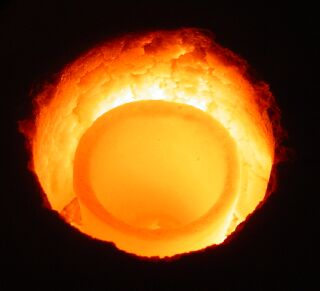
Melting gold in a graphite crucible

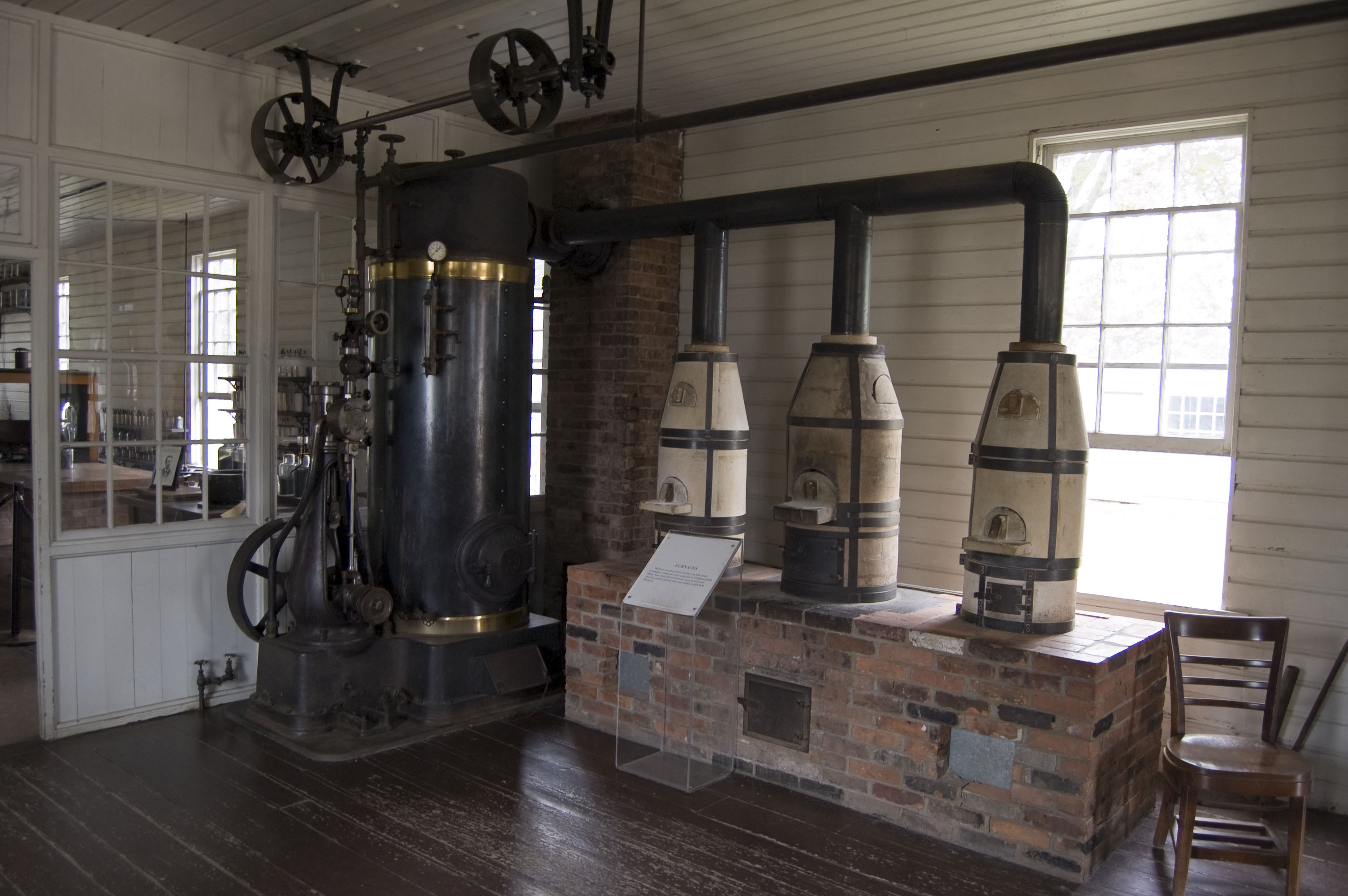
Three crucibles used by Thomas Edison

Crucibles are used in the laboratory to contain chemical compounds when they are heated to extremely high temperatures. Crucibles are available in several sizes and typically come with a correspondingly-sized lid. When heated over a flame, the crucible is often held inside a pipeclay triangle which itself is held on top of a tripod.

Crucibles and their covers are made of heat-resistant materials, usually porcelain, alumina or an inert metal. Ceramics such as alumina, zirconia, and especially magnesia will tolerate the highest temperatures. However, chemical reactions with the material in the crucible must be kept in mind; the emergence of melting point-lowering eutectic systems is an especially important consideration. More recently, metals such as nickel and zirconium have been used. The lids are typically loose-fitting in order to allow gases to escape during the heating of a sample inside. Crucibles and their lids can come in high form and low form shapes and in various sizes, but rather small 10 to 15 ml size porcelain crucibles are commonly used for gravimetric chemical analysis. These smaller crucibles and their covers made of porcelain are quite cheap when sold in large quantities to laboratories, and the crucibles are sometimes disposed of after use in precise quantitative chemical analysis. There is usually a large mark-up when they are sold individually in hobby shops.

=== Chemical analysis usage ===
In the area of chemical analysis, crucibles are used in quantitative gravimetric chemical analysis (analysis by measuring mass of an analyte or its derivative). Common crucible use may be as follows. A residue or precipitate in a chemical analysis method can be collected or filtered from some sample or solution on special "ashless" filter paper. The crucible and lid to be used are pre-weighed very accurately on an analytical balance. After some possible washing and/or pre-drying of this filtrate, the residue on the filter paper can be placed in the crucible and fired (heated at very high temperature) until all the volatiles and moisture are driven out of the sample residue in the crucible. The "ashless" filter paper is completely burned up in this process. The crucible with the sample and lid is allowed to cool in a desiccator. The crucible and lid with the sample inside are weighed very accurately again only after it has completely cooled to room temperature (higher temperature would cause air currents around the balance giving inaccurate results). The mass of the empty, pre-weighed crucible and lid is subtracted from this result to yield the mass of the completely dried residue in the crucible.

A crucible with a bottom perforated with small holes which are designed specifically for use in filtration, especially for gravimetric analysis as just described, is called a Gooch crucible after its inventor, Frank Austin Gooch.

For completely accurate results, the crucible is handled with clean tongs because fingerprints can add a weighable mass to the crucible. Porcelain crucibles are hygroscopic, i. e. they absorb a bit of weighable moisture from the air. For this reason, the porcelain crucible and lid is also pre-fired (pre-heating to high temperature) to constant mass before the pre-weighing. This determines the mass of the completely dry crucible and lid. At least two firings, coolings, and weighings resulting in exactly the same mass are needed to confirm the constant (completely dry) mass of the crucible and lid and similarly again for the crucible, lid, and sample residue inside. Since the mass of every crucible and lid is different, the pre-firing/pre-weighing must be done for every new crucible/lid used. The desiccator contains desiccant to absorb moisture from the air inside, so the air inside will be completely dry.

== See also ==
- Hessian crucible
- Micro-pulling-down
- Ladle (metallurgy)
- Wax melter

== Bibliography ==
1. Craddock P., 1995, Early Metal Mining and Production, Edinburgh University Press Ltd, Edinburgh
2. Hauptmann A., T. Rehren & Schmitt-Strecker S., 2003, Early Bronze Age copper metallurgy at Shahr-i Sokhta (Iran), reconsidered, T. Stollner, G. Korlin, G. Steffens & J. Cierny, Eds., Man and mining, studies in honour of Gerd Weisgerber on occasion of his 65th birthday, Deutsches Bergbau Museum, Bochum
3. Martinon-Torres M. & Rehren Th., 2009, Post Medieval crucible Production and Distribution: A Study of Materials and Materialities, Archaeometry Vol.51 No.1 pp49–74
4. O. Faolain S., 2004, Bronze Artefact Production in Late Bronze Age Ireland: A Survey, British Archaeological Report, British Series 382, Archaeopress, Oxford
5. Rehren, Th. and Papakhristu, O., 2000, Cutting Edge Technology – The Ferghana Process of Medieval crucible steel Smelting, Metalla, Bochum, 7(2) pp55–69
6. Rehren T. & Thornton C. P, 2009, A truly refractory crucible from fourth millennium Tepe Hissar, Northeast Iran, Journal of Archaeological Science, Vol. 36, pp2700–2712
7. Rehren Th., 1999, Small Size, Large Scale Roman brass Production in Germania Inferior, Journal of Archaeological Science, Vol. 26, pp 1083–1087
8. Rehren Th., 2003, Crucibles as Reaction Vessels in Ancient Metallurgy, Ed in P. Craddock & J. Lang, Mining and Metal Production Through the Ages, British Museum Press, London pp207–215
9. Roberts B. W., Thornton C. P. & Pigott V. C., 2009, Development of Metallurgy in Eurasia, Antiquity Vol. 83 pp 1012–1022
10. Scheel B., 1989, Egyptian Metalworking and Tools, Shire Egyptology, Bucks
11. Vavelidis M. & Andreou S., 2003, Gold and Gold working in Later Bronze Age Northern Greece, Naturwissenschaften, Vol. 95, pp 361–366
12. Zwicker U., Greiner H., Hofmann K. & Reithinger M., 1985, Smelting, Refining and Alloying of copper and copper Alloys in Crucible Furnaces During Prehistoric up to Roman Times, P. Craddock & M. Hughes, Furnaces and Smelting Technology in Antiquity, British Museum, London
