= Crucible tongs =

Scissor-like tool used for grasping hot objects in a laboratory

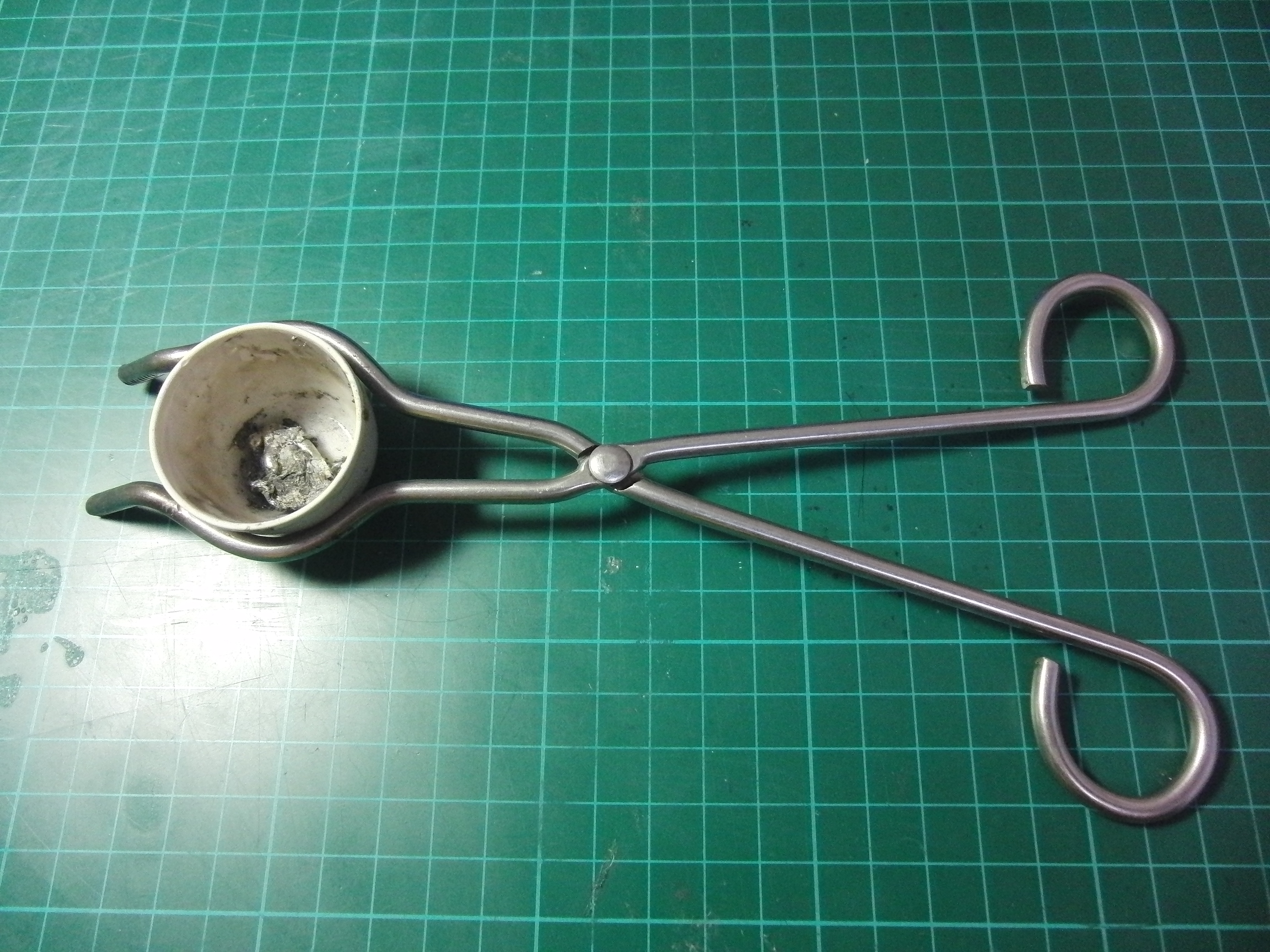
Crucible tongs

Crucible tongs are scissors-like tools with a pair of attached arms that curve outward near the ends to form a rounded gripping area that allows users to safely grasp crucibles, flasks, evaporating dishes, or small beakers. They are made of durable metals—stainless steel, brass, or nickel, for example—that can withstand high temperatures.

== Use ==
Crucible tongs are used most often with crucibles, small ceramic or metal vessels used to heat chemicals to temperatures up to 565.56 degree Celsius.

As a crucible will be very hot when heating it in a furnace or a Bunsen burner, one cannot hold the crucible directly. Therefore, crucible tongs come to play a key role when burning, or doing anything with hot objects. Moreover, some of them also have a special characteristic. For instance, a locking version of crucible tongs can be locked with the edge of a crucible, allow users to be more comfortable and more confidence while moving a very hot crucible from place to place. Hence, they provide more safety for the users.

== Safety ==
It is necessary to wear safety goggles, gloves, and proper shoes when using crucible tongs. The scorching objects in a crucible might be spilled off and cause damage to the holder's skin. Since crucible tongs work with the crucible, one must know the safety procedures of the crucible.

- Before using the crucible, make sure that it is dry
- Fill the crucible with sample chemicals to only 1/2 or 2/3, do not fill until it is full
- If the user used the crucible to fuse the glass, waiting for the crucible to cool down before cleaning it
- Squeezing the crucible or use some metal sticks to break the cooling glass out of the crucible
- Wash it until it is clean enough

== Additional images ==
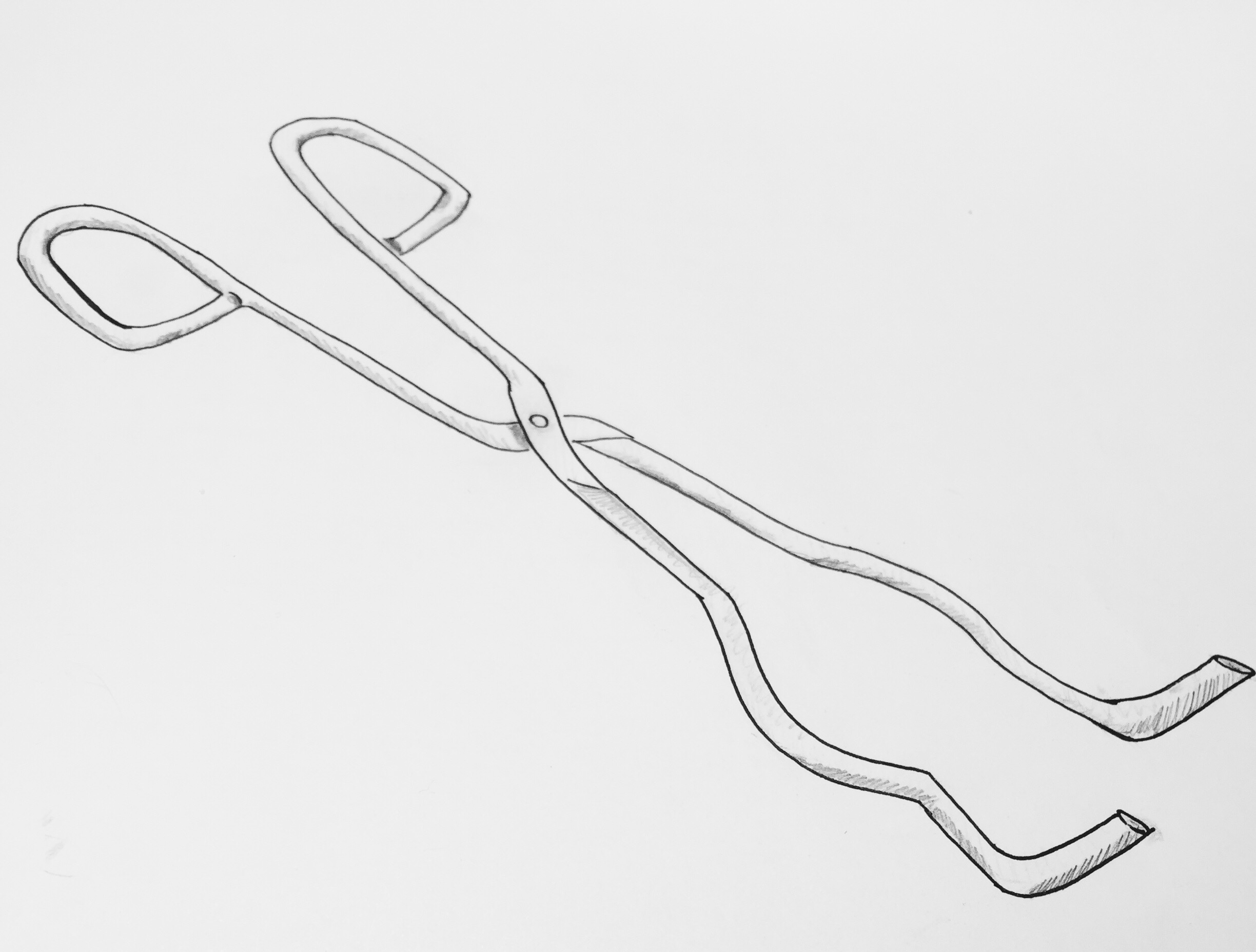

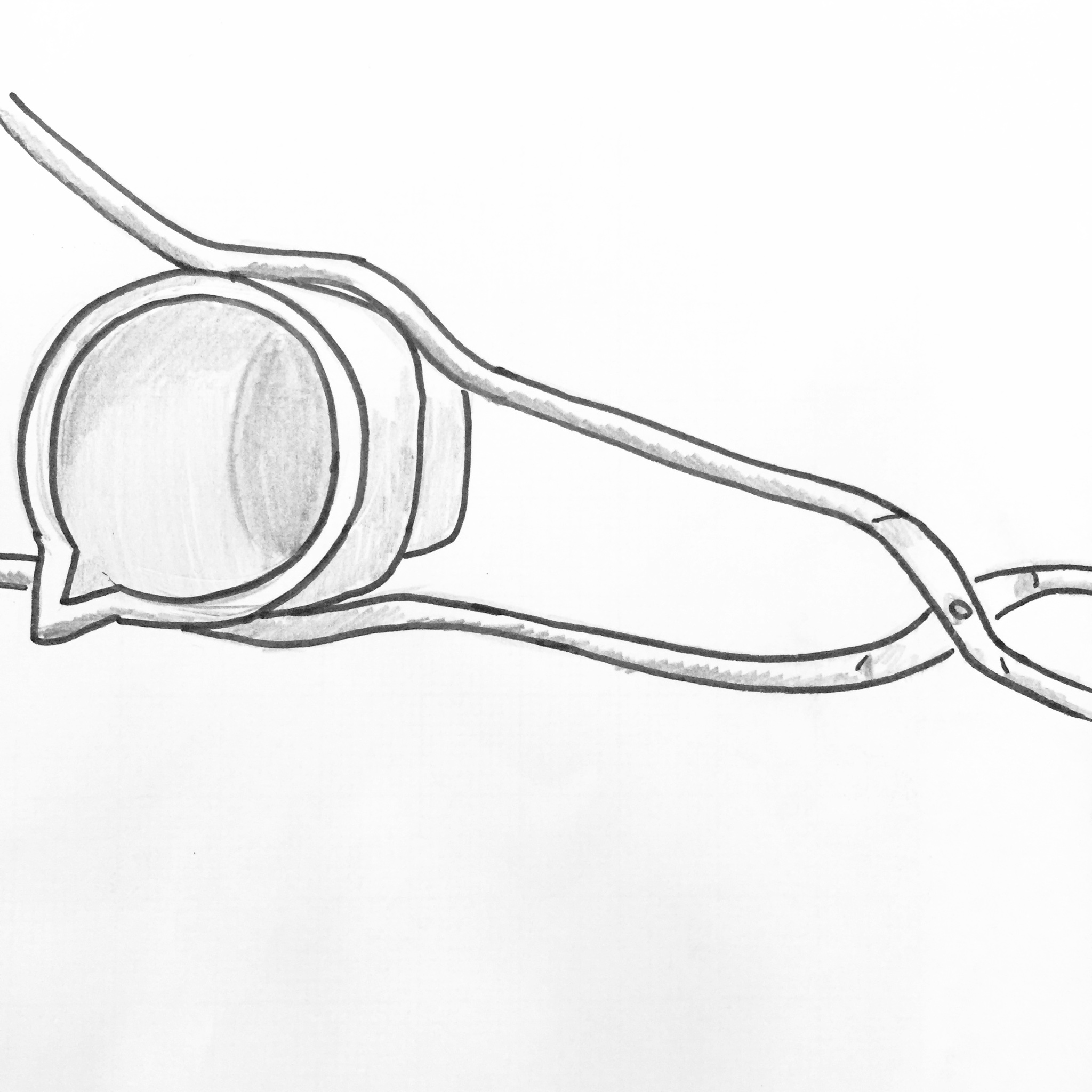
Crucible Tongs with Crucible

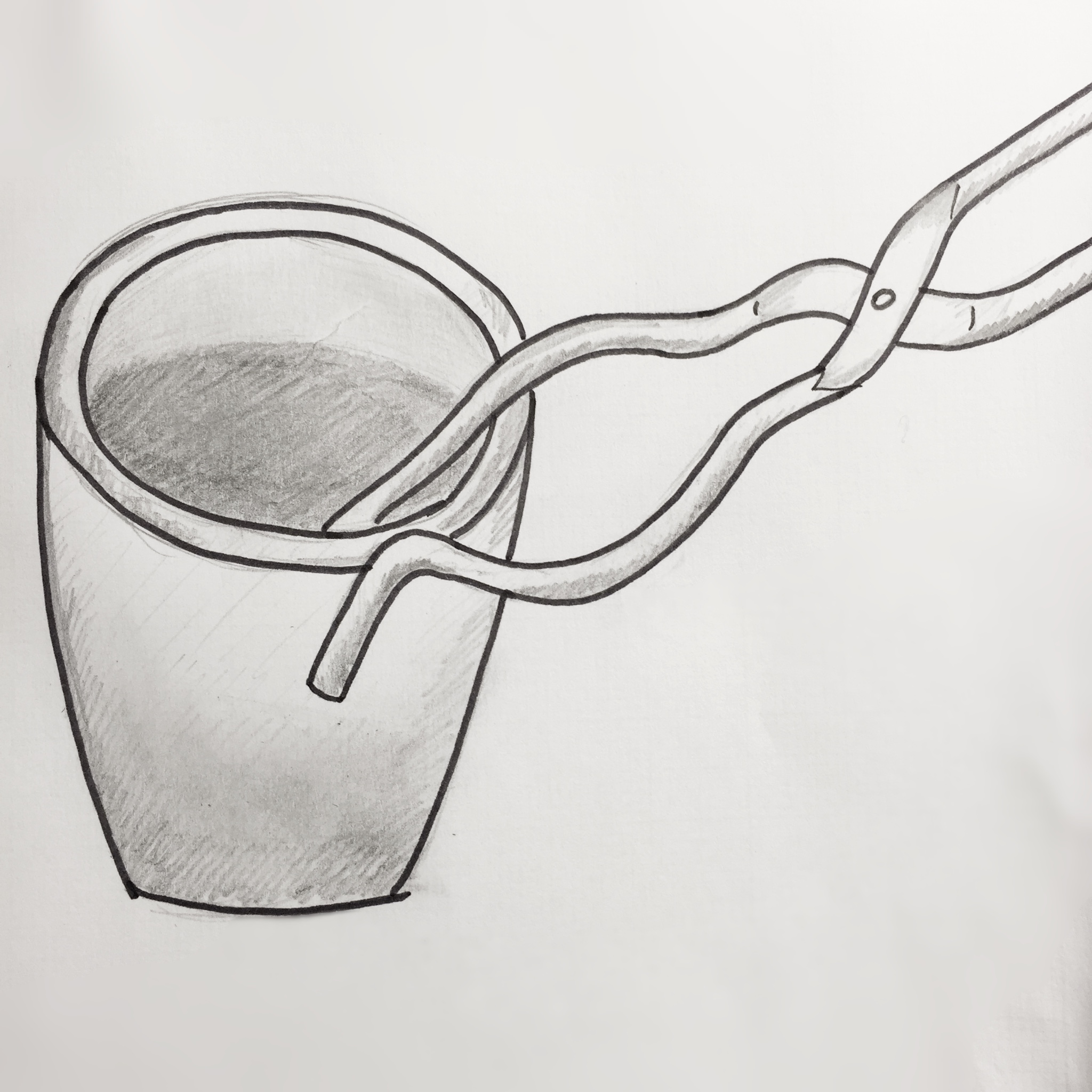
