= Tongs =

Tool for gripping

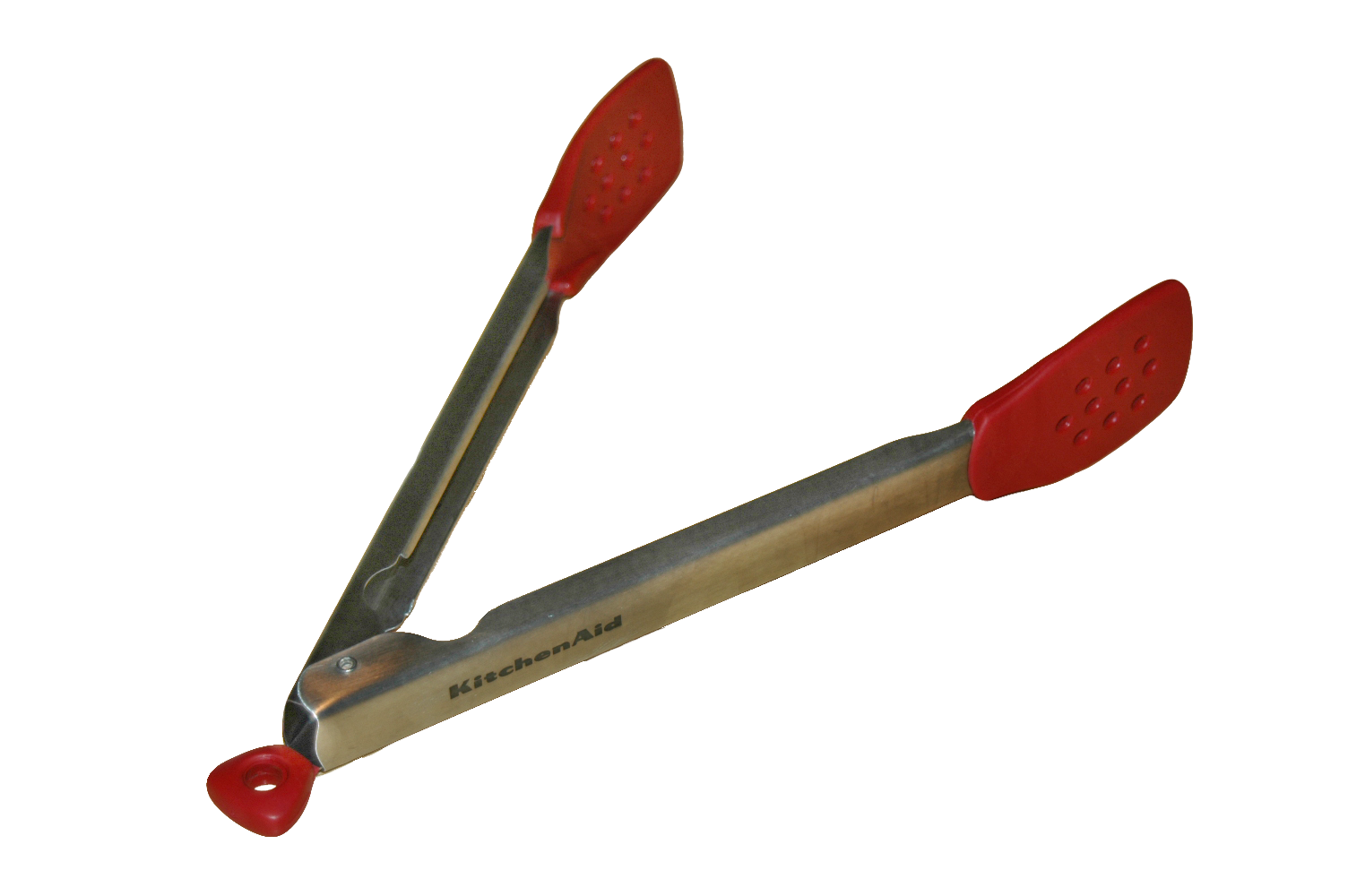
Silicone-tipped locking tongs designed to withstand temperatures up to 500 °F (260 °C)

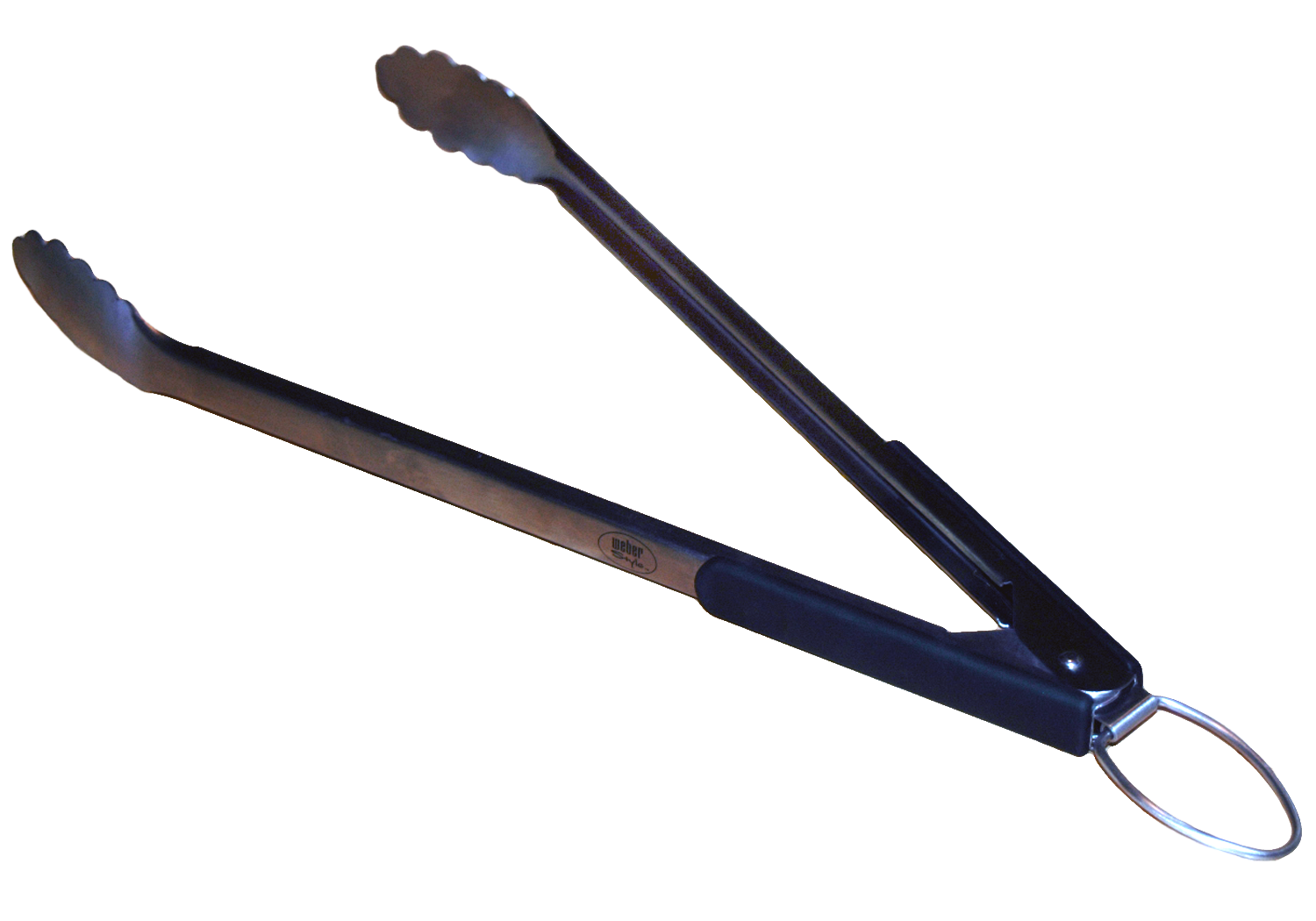
Long handled locking tongs designed for outdoor grilling

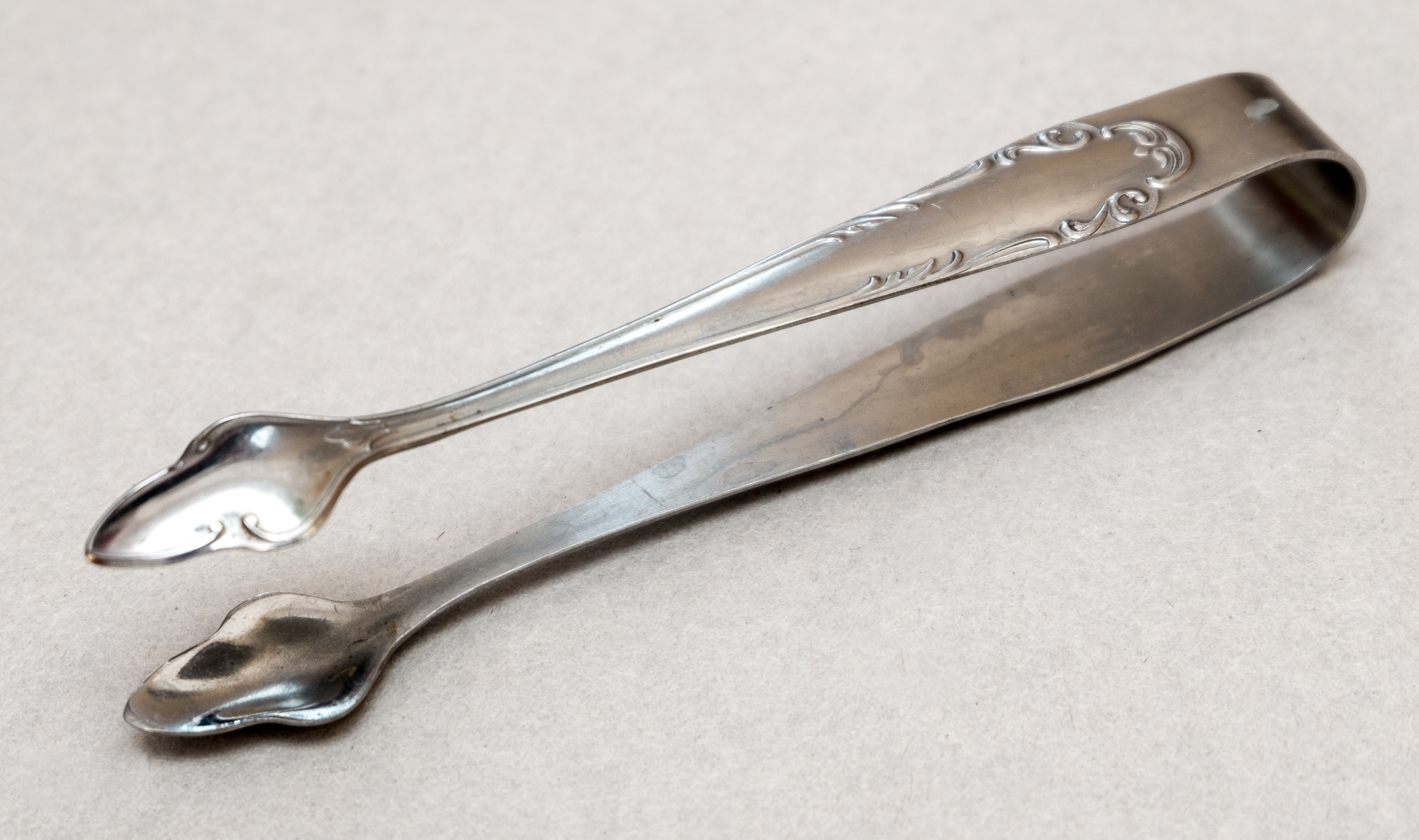
Sugar tong

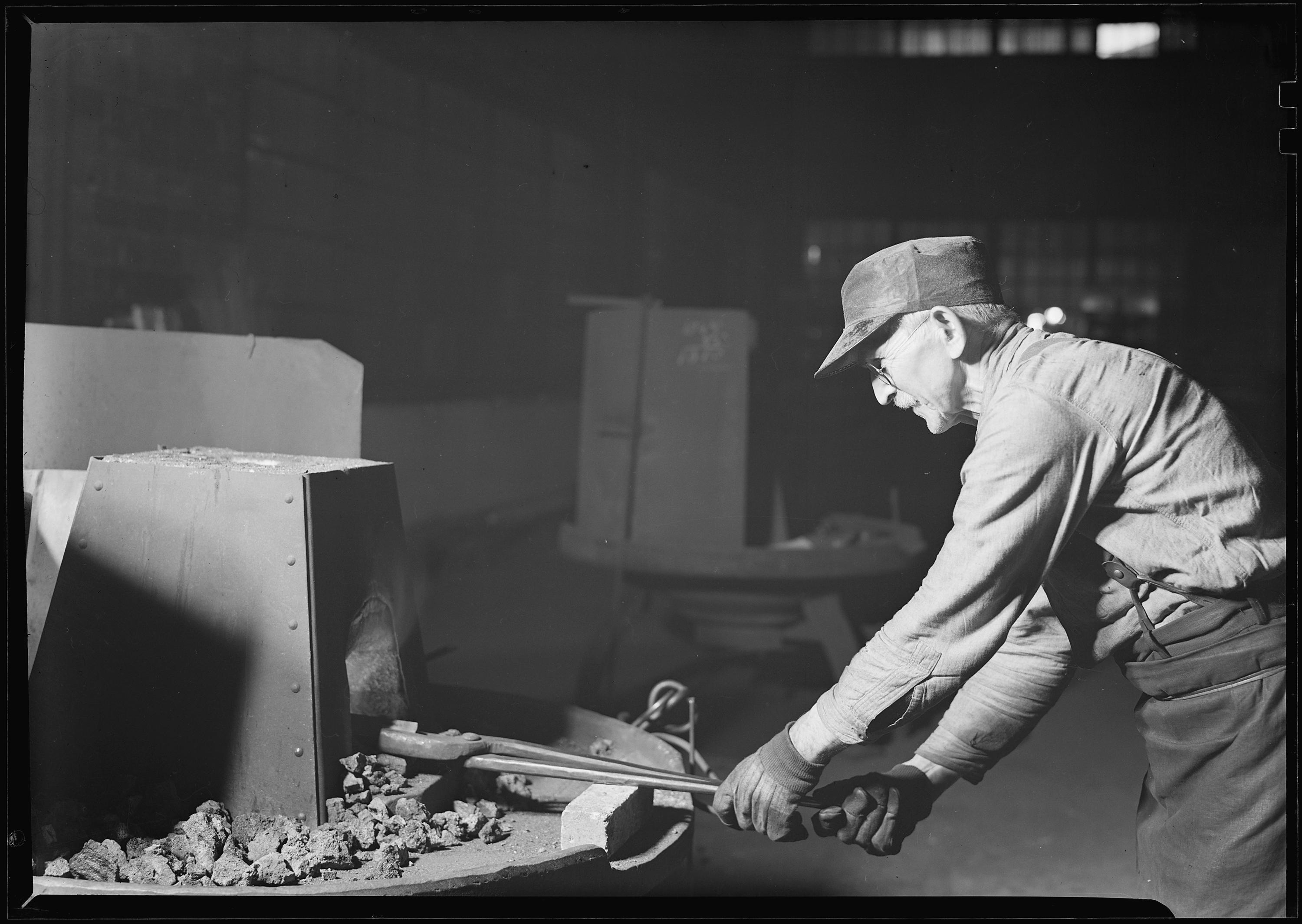
Blacksmith tongs used for forging

Tongs are a type of tool used to grip and lift objects, often too hot to hold, instead of holding them with the hands. There are many forms of tongs adapted to their specific use. Design variations include resting points so that the working end of the tongs does not come into contact with a bench surface.

Tongs are known to have been used by the Ancient Egyptians. The first tongs were probably basic wooden tongs, which were eventually followed by bronze bars from as early as 3000BC. Over time they progressed to modern forms. An Egyptian wall painting from 1450 BCE shows a crucible supported between two metal bars.

- Tongs that have long arms terminating in small flat circular ends of tongs and are pivoted at a joint close to the handle used to handle delicate objects. Common fire-tongs, used for picking up pieces of coal and placing them on a fire without burning fingers or getting them dirty are of this type. Tongs for grilling, and tongs for serving salad or spaghetti are kitchen utensils of the same type. They provide a way to move, rotate and turn the food with delicate precision, or fetch a full serving in one grab.
- Tongs consist a single band of bent metal, as in sugar tongs, most asparagus tongs (which are no longer common) and the like. Sugar tongs are usually silver, with claw-shaped or spoon-shaped ends for serving lump sugar. Asparagus tongs are usually similar but larger, with a band near the head that limits how far the tongs can expand. Asparagus tongs for serving were introduced in 18th-century England, with smaller versions for eating asparagus appearing in the 19th century.
- Tongs in which the pivot or joint is placed close to the gripping ends are used to handle hard and heavy objects. Driller's round tongs, blacksmith's tongs or crucible tongs are of this type.

According to a myth in the classical Jewish text Pirkei Avot, the first pair of tongs was created by God after he rested on the seventh day after creation. The reasoning is that a blacksmith must use a pair of tongs when making a new pair of tongs, so that God must have provided humankind with the first pair of tongs.

Logging tongs in the coat of arms of Konnevesi

== See also ==
- Fire iron
- Food preparation utensils
- Forceps
- Tweezers
