= Gooch crucible =

Filtration device

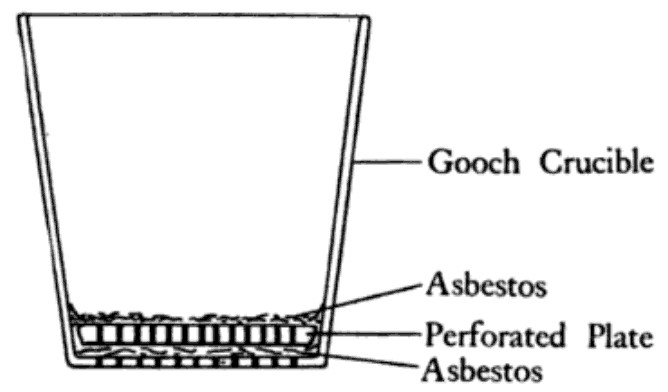
Side view of a Gooch crucible with 2 layers of asbestos.

A Gooch crucible, named after Frank Austin Gooch, is a filtration device for laboratory use (and was also called a Gooch filter). It is convenient for collecting a precipitate directly within the vessel in which it is to be dried, possibly ashed, and finally weighed in gravimetric analysis. It is also used for collecting and processing biological tissue samples within the same container.

In its original design, the device was a standard platinum laboratory crucible with a perforated base. To prepare it for use, one pours in a slurry of acid-washed asbestos fibres, and use a pump to suck from below, so that the asbestos fibers form a felt-like layer at the bottom. The crucible was then heated in an oven to dry out until it attained constant weight. After it is prepared, one can use it to collect some precipitate to be analyzed, then heat the precipitate to dry, or oxidize, or ash. See (Cumming & Kay 1913, pp. 112–115) for detailed instructions for using the crucible as of 1913.

Due to the health hazards of asbestos, other inorganic fibers, notably glass, have been used in place of asbestos.

Since platinum is expensive, versions made of porcelain were introduced in 1882. Some Gooch crucibles, such as the one in the drawing, permit two layers of asbestos to be used, separated by a perforated porcelain plate. Gooch crucibles made of borosilicate glass with fritted glass bases are more common today. Gooch crucibles made of platinum may still be required for the most corrosive materials, porcelain is used where ashing at high temperature is required, and those made of borosilicate glass are adequate for drying.

== See also ==
- Aspirator (pump)
- Filter flask
