= Wax melter =

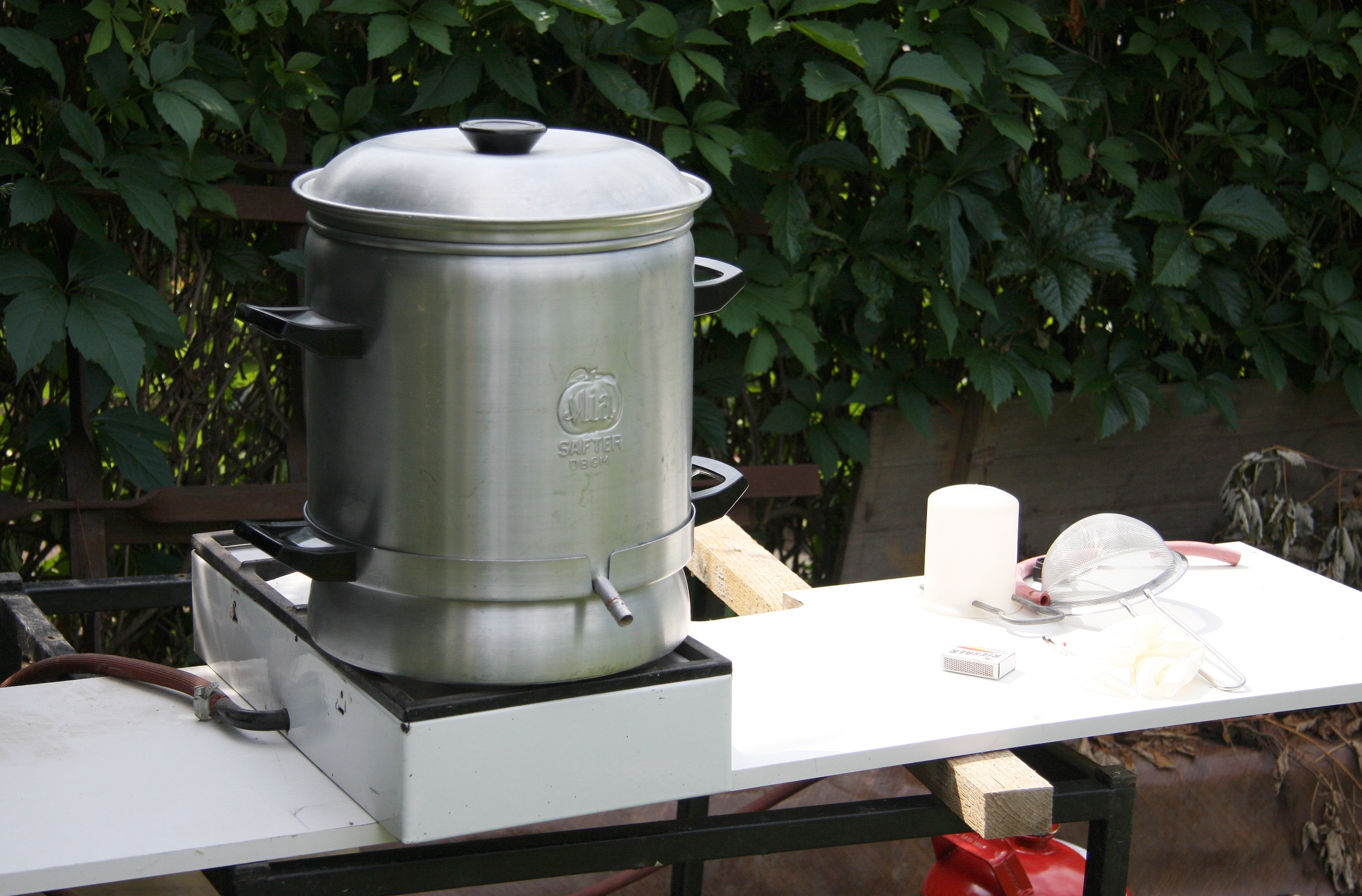
Photograph of a beeswax melter

Wax melters are devices used in the packaging and candle-making industries to melt wax.

The type of tank used to melt candle wax is quite different from adhesives, solder, and tar. For example, tanks used for adhesives may need to be heated up to 260 °C (500 °F) whilst an organic soy wax will be ruined at over 60 °C (140 °F) and should never be heated above 93 °C (200 °F). A delicate soy wax used to make candles would be destroyed and burned if not heated in an even manner at lower temperatures than solder or tar. Also, since soaps and candles are scented and coloured, tanks designed for melting these substances need to be specially polished to ensure there is no contamination between different scented/coloured candles or soap. For this reason, there are melting tanks that are specially coated for candle wax melting.

== Types ==
Wax melters, such as melting tanks, are generally classified as either 'direct heating' or 'water jacket heating'. A third type is known as the convection melter.

A water jacket melter is generally preferred if more than 40 litres or so are to be poured. A melter should be polished and have a coating to prevent cross contamination if heavily scented or coloured substances are to be used.

=== Direct heat ===
Direct heat melters are generally made from aluminium and can heat up to over 260 °C (500 °F). The uses vary from wax to solder. These melters have the heating element placed in contact with the aluminium, which is directly against the substance to be melted, hence the name 'direct melter'. Since these melters apply heat directly, they generally cannot be larger than 20-40 litres.

=== Water jacket ===
Water Jacket Melters function more like a large, commercial double boiler in that they keep substances evenly heated but generally heat up to only 100 °C (212 °F), since that is the boiling point of water. They can be made of aluminium, but are generally made of stainless steel. Unlike direct heat melters, water jacket melters can be almost unlimited in size, with 580 litres being common and up to the larger ~3800 litre melters and more.

=== Convection ===
There is another type of melter which uses convection heating similar to an oven but these are generally more expensive than normal heaters, even though they are very inefficient and take a long time to heat simply because they rely on air to heat. Since wax is flammable, another concern with using convection melters is that the flash point of wax will be triggered and there will be an explosion. Convection melters are dangerous when heating flammable substances and should not be used.

== See also ==
- Crucible
