= Frank Austin Gooch =

American chemist and engineer

Frank Austin Gooch in 1886

Frank Austin Gooch (1852 – 1929) was an American chemist and engineer.

== Biography ==
He was born to Joshua G. and Sarah Gates (Coolidge) Gooch in Watertown, Massachusetts. On his mother's side of the family, he was a descendant of Thomas Hastings who came from the East Anglia region of England to the Massachusetts Bay Colony in 1634.

Gooch invented the Gooch crucible, which is used, for example, to determine the solubility of bituminous materials such as road tars and petroleum asphalts. He was awarded a Ph.D. by Harvard University in 1877. Gooch was a professor of chemistry at Yale University from 1885 to 1918.

He devised or perfected a large number of analytical processes and methods, including:

- Invented the Gooch filtering crucible.
- Studied the quantitative separation of lithium from the other alkali metals, and the estimation of boric acid by distillation with methanol and fixation by calcium oxide.
- Developed methods for estimating molybdenum, vanadium, selenium, and tellurium.
- Studied the use of the paratungstate and pyrophosphate ions in analysis.
- Developed a series of methods for estimating various elements based on the volumetric determination of iodine.
- Discovered a method for the rapid electrolytic estimation of metals.

He was a member of the Connecticut Academy of Arts and Sciences, the American Philosophical Society, the American Academy of Arts and Sciences, and the U.S. National Academy of Sciences.
