= Adamant (disambiguation) =

Adamant is a poetic term used to refer to any especially hard substance.

Adamant may also refer to:

== Arts and entertainment ==
- Adam Adamant Lives!, a BBC television series in the 1960s
- Adamant (album), an album by the German band Stahlmann
- Adam Ant (born 1954), New Romantic singer of the 1980s

== Ships ==
- HMS Adamant, several ships of the Royal Navy
- USS Adamant (AMc-62), a 1941 Accentor-class minesweeper in the US Navy during World War II
- Adamant (ship), several merchant vessels

== Other uses ==
- Adamant, Vermont, an unincorporated community in the US
- Adamant Co., Ltd., a Japanese company

== See also ==
- Adamantane, a bulky hydrocarbon
- Adamantium, a fictional metal alloy appearing in American comic books published by Marvel Comics
- Adamantine (disambiguation)
- Adamantius (disambiguation)
