= Adamantine =

Adamantine may refer to:

- Adamant or adamantine, a generic name for a very hard material
- Adamantine (veneer), a patented celluloid veneer
- Adamantine lustre, a property of some minerals
- Adamantine spar, a mineral
- Adamantine, a 2018 album by Burgerkill
- "Adamantine", a 1996 song by Thirty Ought Six, released as Mute Records 196

== See also ==
- Adamant (disambiguation)
- Adamantane, a bulky hydrocarbon
- Adamantinoma, a form of bone cancer
- Adamantium, a fictional metal alloy appearing in comic books published by Marvel Comics
- Amantadine, a chemical compound
