= Emery (rock) =

Metamorphic rock

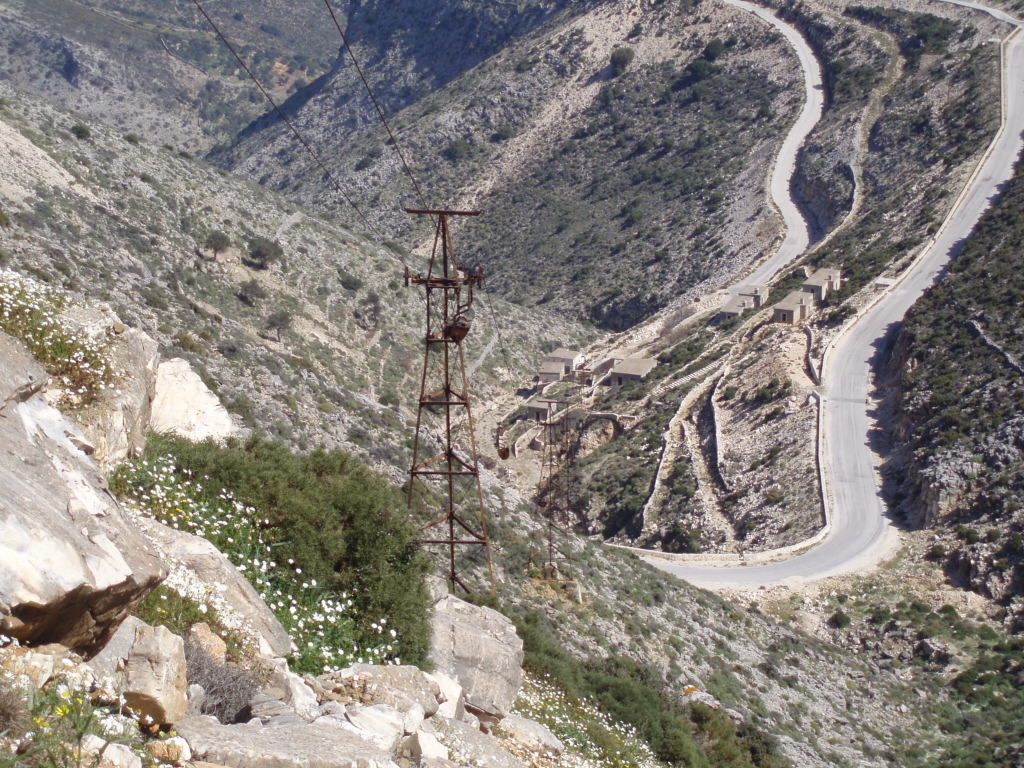
Emery mine on Naxos Island

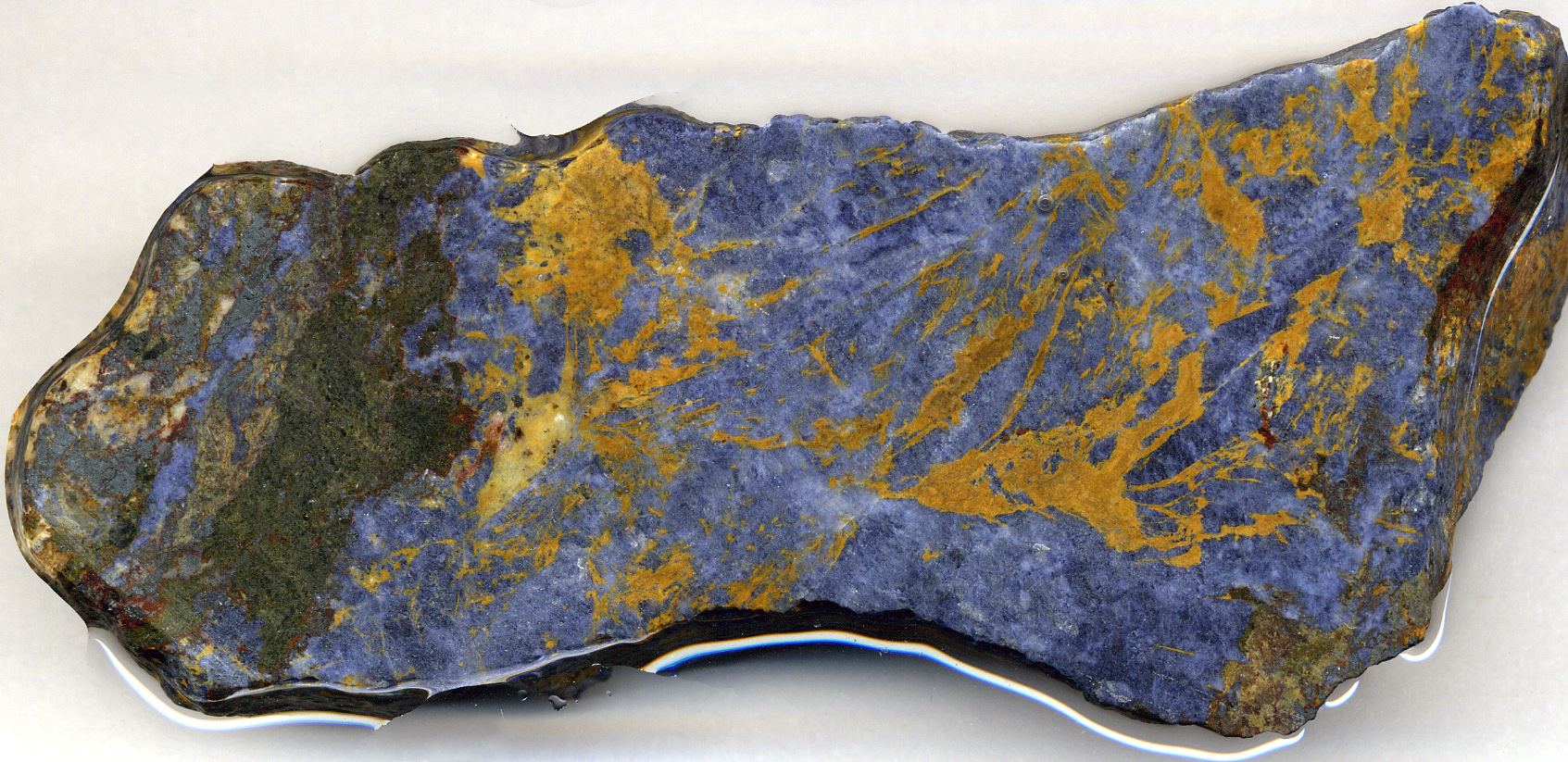
Corundite from the Naxos emery deposits. The corundum is blue, or sapphire. Wet slab, 10 cm (3.9 in) wide.

Emery, or corundite, is a dark granular rock used to make an abrasive powder. The rock largely consists of corundum (aluminium oxide), mixed with other minerals. Industrial emery may contain a variety of other minerals and synthetic compounds. Crushed or naturally eroded emery (known as black sand) is used as an abrasive. Turkey and Greece are the main suppliers of the world's emery.

== Description ==
Emery is a granular rock used to make an abrasive powder. It largely consists of corundum (aluminium oxide), mixed with other minerals such as the iron-bearing spinels, hercynite, and magnetite, and also rutile (titania). Industrial emery may contain a variety of other minerals and synthetic compounds such as magnesia, mullite, and silica.

Emery is black or dark grey in colour, less dense than translucent-brown corundum with a specific gravity of between 3.5 and 3.8. Because it can be a mixture of minerals, no definite Mohs hardness can be assigned: the hardness of corundum is 9 and that of some spinel-group minerals is near 8, but the hardness of others such as magnetite is near 6.

== Use ==
Crushed or naturally eroded emery (known as black sand) is used as an abrasive—for example, on emery boards and emery cloth. It is also used as a traction enhancer in asphalt and tarmac mixtures.

A small quantity of emery is used in coated abrasive products, but its main use in the United States is wear-resistant floors and pavements. Many tons are shipped to Asia to be used in grinding rice.

Solomon's shamir, a substance used to cut stone during construction of the First Temple, was likely emery.

== Harvest ==
Turkey and Greece are the main suppliers of the world's emery. These two countries produced about 17,500 tons of the mineral in 1987.

In 2010, Turkey's emery production was 6,000 tonnes, while Greece's was 2,000 tonnes, according to data from the U.S. Geological Survey (USGS).

The Greek island of Naxos used to be the main source of this industrially important rock type. It has been mined on the eastern side of Naxos for well over two thousand years as mentioned by Pliny the Elder's The Natural History, book XXXVII, chp. 32. However, demand for emery has decreased with the development of sintered carbide and oxide materials as abrasives.

== Safety ==
In the United States, the Occupational Safety and Health Administration has set permissible exposure limits for emery in the workplace: TWA 15 mg/m^{3} total exposure and TWA 5 mg/m^{3} respiratory exposure.

== See also ==
- Emery paper
- Emery Tales
