= Chromite =

Crystalline mineral

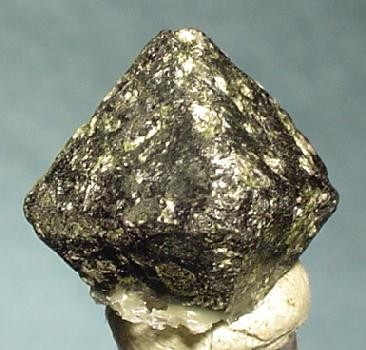
- Octahedral chromite crystal from the Freetown Layered Complex in Sierra Leone, Africa (size: 1.3 x 1.2 x 1.2 cm)

General
- Category: Oxide minerals Spinel group Spinel structural group
- Formula: (Fe, Mg)Cr_{2}O_{4}
- IMA symbol: Chr
- Strunz classification: 4.BB.05
- Crystal system: Isometric
- Crystal class: Hexoctahedral (m3̅m); H-M symbol: (4/m 3̅ 2/m)
- Space group: Fd3̅m (no. 227)
- Unit cell: a = 8.344 Å; Z = 8

Identification
- Color: Black to brownish black; brown to brownish black on thin edges in transmitted light
- Crystal habit: Octahedral rare; massive to granular
- Twinning: Spinel law on {Ill}
- Cleavage: None, parting may develop along {III}
- Fracture: Uneven
- Tenacity: Brittle
- Mohs scale hardness: 5.5
- Luster: Resinous, Greasy, Metallic, Sub-Metallic, Dull
- Streak: Brown
- Diaphaneity: Translucent to opaque
- Specific gravity: 4.5–4.8
- Optical properties: Isotropic
- Refractive index: n = 2.08–2.16
- Other characteristics: Weakly magnetic

Chromite is a crystalline mineral composed primarily of iron(II) oxide and chromium(III) oxide compounds. It can be represented by the chemical formula of FeCr_{2}O_{4}. It is an oxide mineral belonging to the spinel group. The element magnesium can substitute for iron in variable amounts as it forms a solid solution with magnesiochromite (MgCr_{2}O_{4}). Substitution of the element aluminium can also occur, leading to hercynite (FeAl_{2}O_{4}). Chromite today is mined particularly to make stainless steel through the production of ferrochrome (FeCr), which is an iron-chromium alloy.

Chromite grains are commonly found in large mafic igneous intrusions such as the Bushveld in South Africa and India. Chromite is iron-black in color with a metallic luster, a dark brown streak and a hardness on the Mohs scale of 5.5.

== Properties ==
Chromite minerals are mainly found in mafic-ultramafic igneous intrusions and are also sometimes found in metamorphic rocks. The chromite minerals occur in layered formations that can be hundreds of kilometres long and a few meters thick. Chromite is also common in iron meteorites and form in association with silicates and troilite minerals.

=== Crystal structure ===
The chemical composition of chromite can be represented as FeCr_{2}O_{4}, with the iron in the +2 oxidation state and the chromium in the +3 oxidation state. The structure of the ore can be seen as platy, with breakages along planes of weakness. Chromite can also be presented in a thin section. The grains seen in thin sections are disseminated with crystals that are euhedral to subhedral.

Chromite contains Mg, ferrous iron [Fe(II)], Al and trace amounts of Ti. Chromite can change into different minerals based on the amounts of each element in the mineral. Chromite is a part of the spinel group, which means that it is able to form a complete solid solution series with other members in the same group. These include minerals such as chenmingite (FeCr_{2}O_{4}), xieite (FeCr_{2}O_{4}), magnesiochromite (MgCr_{2}O_{4}) and magnetite (Fe^{II}Fe^{III}_{2}O_{4}). Chenmingite and xieite are polymorphs of chromite while magnesiochromite and magnetite are isostructural with chromite.

=== Crystal size and morphology ===
Chromite occurs as massive and granular crystals and very rarely as octahedral crystals. Twinning for this mineral occurs on the {III} plane as described by the spinel law.

Grains of minerals are generally small in size. However, chromite grains up to 3 cm have been found. These grains are seen to crystallize from the liquid of a meteorite body where there are low amounts of chromium and oxygen. The large grains are associated with stable supersaturated conditions seen from the meteorite body.

=== Reactions ===
Chromite is an important mineral in helping to determine the conditions that rocks form. It can have reactions with various gases such as CO and CO_{2}. The reaction between these gases and the solid chromite grains results in the reduction of the chromite and allows for the formation of iron and chromium alloys. There could also be a formation of metal carbides from the interaction with chromite and the gases.

Chromite is seen to form early in the crystallization process. This allows for chromite to be resistant to the alteration effects of high temperatures and pressures seen in the metamorphic series. It is able to progress through the metamorphic series unaltered. Other minerals with a lower resistance are seen to alter in this series to minerals such as serpentine, biotite and garnet.

== Distribution of deposits ==
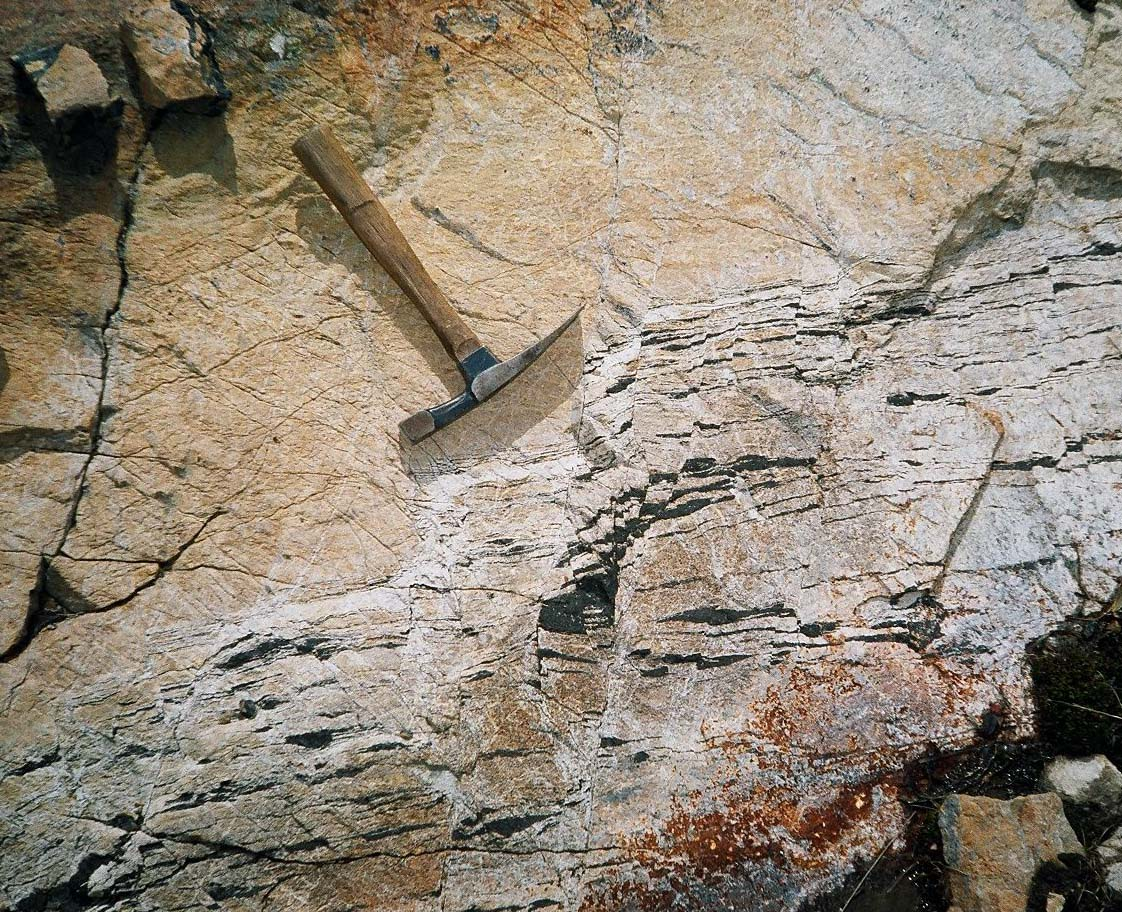
A chromite prospect in Yukon. The black bands are chromite, which also carries platinum group metals. Gray rock is bleached ultramafics.

Chromite is found as orthocumulate lenses in peridotite from the Earth's mantle. It also occurs in layered, ultramafic intrusive rocks. In addition, it is found in metamorphic rocks such as some serpentinites. Ore deposits of chromite form as early magmatic differentiates. It is commonly associated with olivine, magnetite, serpentine and corundum. The vast Bushveld Igneous Complex of South Africa is a large layered mafic to ultramafic igneous body with some layers consisting of 90% chromite, forming the rare rock type chromitite (cf. chromite the mineral and chromitite, a rock containing chromite). The Stillwater Igneous Complex in Montana also contains significant chromite.

Chromite suitable for commercial mining is found in just a handful of very substantial deposits. There are 2 main types of chromite deposits: stratiform deposits and podiform deposits. Stratiform deposits in layered intrusions are the main source of chromite resources and are found in South Africa, Canada, Finland, and Madagascar. Chromite resources from podiform deposits are mainly found in Kazakhstan, Turkey, and Albania. Zimbabwe is the only country that contains notable chromite reserves in both stratiform and podiform deposits.

=== Stratiform deposits ===
Stratiform deposits are formed as large sheet-like bodies, usually formed in layered mafic to ultramafic igneous complexes. This type of deposit is used to obtain 98% of the worldwide chromite reserves.

Stratiform deposits are typically seen to be of Precambrian in age and are found in cratons. The mafic to ultramafic igneous provinces that these deposits are formed in were likely intruded into continental crust, which may have contained granites or gneisses. The shapes of these intrusions are described as tabular or funnel-shaped. The tabular intrusions were placed in the form of sills with the layering of these intrusions being parallel. Examples of these tabular intrusions can be seen in the Stillwater Igneous Complex and Bird River. The funnel-shaped intrusions are seen to be dipping towards the center of the intrusion. This gives the layers in this intrusion a syncline formation. Examples of this type of intrusion can be seen in the Bushveld Igneous Complex and the Great Dyke.

Chromite can be seen in stratiform deposits as multiple layers which consist of chromitite. Thicknesses for these layers range between 1 cm and 1 m. Lateral depths can reach lengths of 70 km. Chromitite is the main rock in these layers, with 50–95% of it being made of chromite and the rest being composed of olivine, orthopyroxene, plagioclase, clinopyroxene, and the various alteration products of these minerals. An indication of water in the magma is determined by the presence of brown mica.

=== Podiform deposits ===
Podiform deposits are seen to occur within the ophiolite sequences. The stratigraphy of the ophiolite sequence is deep-ocean sediments, pillow lavas, sheeted dykes, gabbros and ultramafic tectonites.

These deposits are found in ultramafic rocks, most notably in tectonites. It can be seen that the abundance of podiform deposits increase towards the top of the tectonites.

Podiform deposits are irregular in shape. "Pod" is a term given by geologists to express the uncertain morphology of this deposit. This deposit shows foliation that is parallel to the foliation of the host rock. Podiform deposits are described as discordant, subconcordant and concordant. Chromite in podiform deposits form as anhedral grains. The ores seen in this type of deposit have nodular texture and are loosely-packed nodules with a size range of 5–20 mm. Other minerals that are seen in podiform deposits are olivine, orthopyroxene, clinopyroxene, pargasite, Na-mica, albite, and jadeite.

== Health and environmental impacts ==
Chromium extracted from chromite is used on a large scale in many industries, including metallurgy, electroplating, paints, tanning, and paper production. Environmental contamination with hexavalent chromium is a major health and environmental concern. Chromium is most stable in its trivalent (Cr(III)) form, seen in stable compounds such as natural ores. Cr(III) is an essential nutrient, required for lipid and glucose metabolism in animals and humans. In contrast, the second most stable form, hexavalent chromium (Cr(VI)), is generally produced through human activity and rarely seen in nature (as in crocoite), and is a highly toxic carcinogen that may kill animals and humans if ingested in large doses.

Health effects

When chromite ore is mined, it is aimed for the production of ferrochrome and produces a chromite concentrate of a high chromium to iron ratio. It can also be crushed and processed. Chromite concentrate, when combined with a reductant such as coal or coke and a high temperature furnace can produce ferrochrome. Ferrochrome is a type of ferroalloy that is an alloy in between chromium and iron. This ferroalloy, as well as chromite concentrate can introduce various health effects. Introducing a definitive control approach and distinct mitigation techniques can provide importance related to the safety of human health.

When chromite ore is exposed to surface conditions, weathering and oxidation can occur. The element chromium is most abundant in chromite in the form of trivalent (Cr-III). When chromite ore is exposed to aboveground conditions, Cr-III can be converted to Cr-VI, which is the hexavalent state of chromium. Cr-VI is produced from Cr-III by means of dry milling or grinding of the ore. This is due to the moistness of the milling process as well as the atmosphere in which the milling is taking place. A wet environment and a non-oxygenated atmosphere are ideal conditions to produce less Cr-VI, while the opposite is known to create more Cr-VI.

Production of ferrochrome is observed to emit pollutants into the air such as nitrogen oxides, carbon oxides and sulfur oxides, as well as dust particulates with a high concentration of heavy metals such as chromium, zinc, lead, nickel and cadmium. During high temperature smelting of chromite ore to produce Ferrochrome, Cr-III is converted to Cr-VI. As with chromite ore, Ferrochrome is milled and therefore produces Cr-VI. Cr-VI is therefore introduced into the dust when the Ferrochrome is produced. This introduces health risks such as inhalation potential and leaching of toxins into the environment. Human exposure to chromium is ingestion, skin contact, and inhalation. Chromium-III and VI will accumulate in the tissues of humans and animals. The excretion of this type of chromium from the body tends to be very slow which means that elevated concentrations of chromium can be seen decades later in human tissues.

Environmental effects

Chromite mining, chromium, and ferrochrome production can be toxic for the environment. Chromite mining is necessary when it comes to the production of economic commodities.

As a result of leaching of soils and the explicit discharge from industrial activities, weathering of rocks that contain chromium will enter the water column. The route of chromium uptake in plants is still ambiguous, but because it is a nonessential element, chromium will not have a distinct mechanism for that uptake which is independent from chromium speciation. Plant studies have shown that toxic effects on plants from chromium include things such as wilting, narrow leaves, delayed or reduced growth, a decrease in chlorophyll production, damage to root membranes, small root systems, death and many more. Chromium's structure is similar to other essential elements which means that it can impact the mineral nutrition of plants.

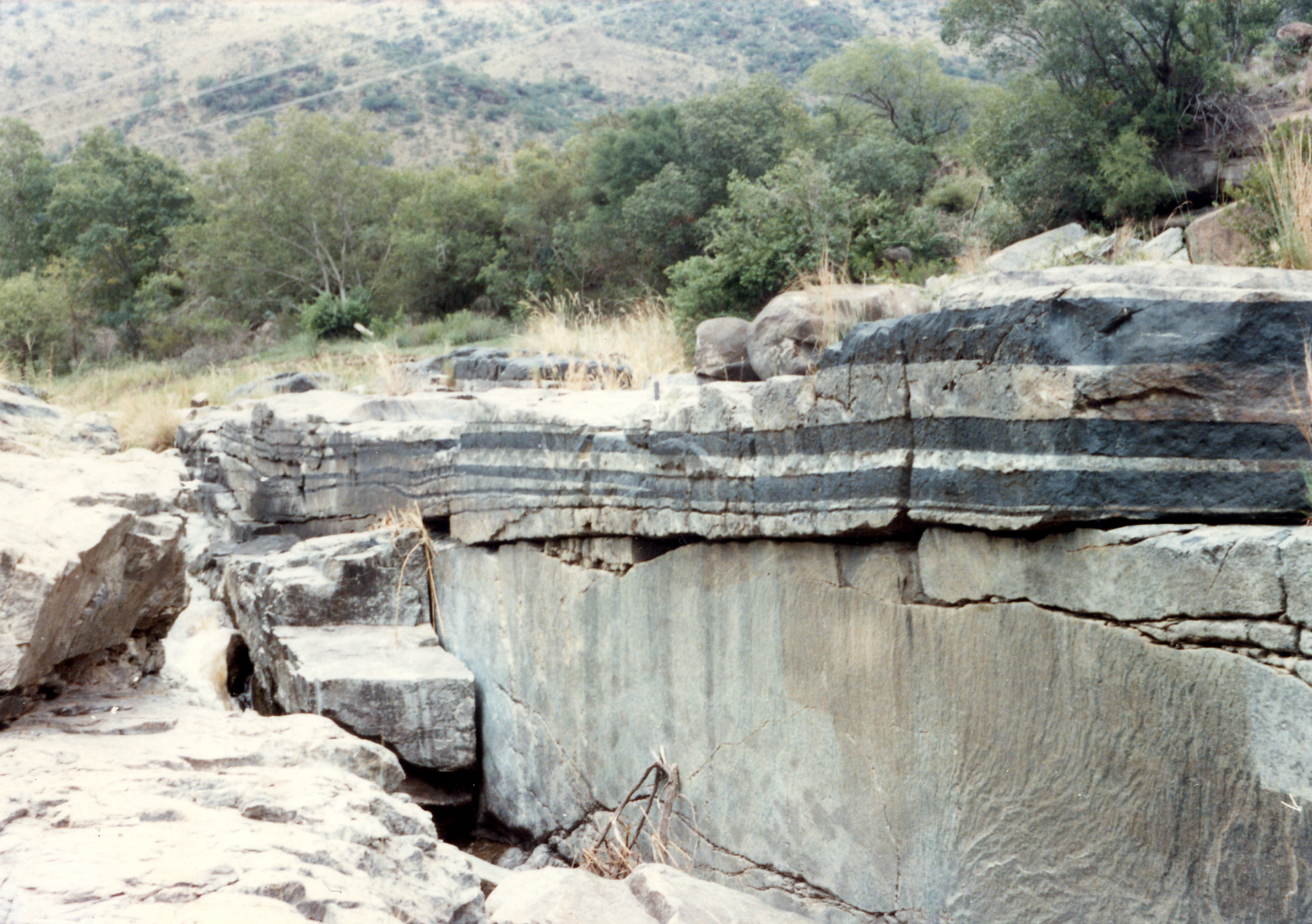
Bushveld Chromite

During industrial activities and production things such as sediment, water, soil, and air all become polluted and contaminated with chromium. Hexavalent chromium has negative impacts towards soil ecology because it decreases soil micro-organism presence, function, and diversity. Chromium concentrations in soil diversify depending on the different compositions of the sediments and rocks that the soil is made from. The chromium present in soil is a mixture of both Cr(VI) and Cr(III). Certain types of chromium such as Chromium-VI has the capability to pass into the cells of organisms. Dust particles from industry operations and industrial wastewater contaminate and pollute surface water, groundwater, and soils.

In aquatic environments, chromium could experience things such as dissolution, sorption, precipitation, oxidation, reduction, and desorption. In aquatic ecosystems chromium bioaccumulates in invertebrates, aquatic plants, fish, and algae. These toxic effects will operate differently because things such as sex, size, and the development stage of an organism may vary. Things such as the temperature of the water, its alkalinity, salinity, pH, and other contaminants will also impact these toxic effects on organisms.

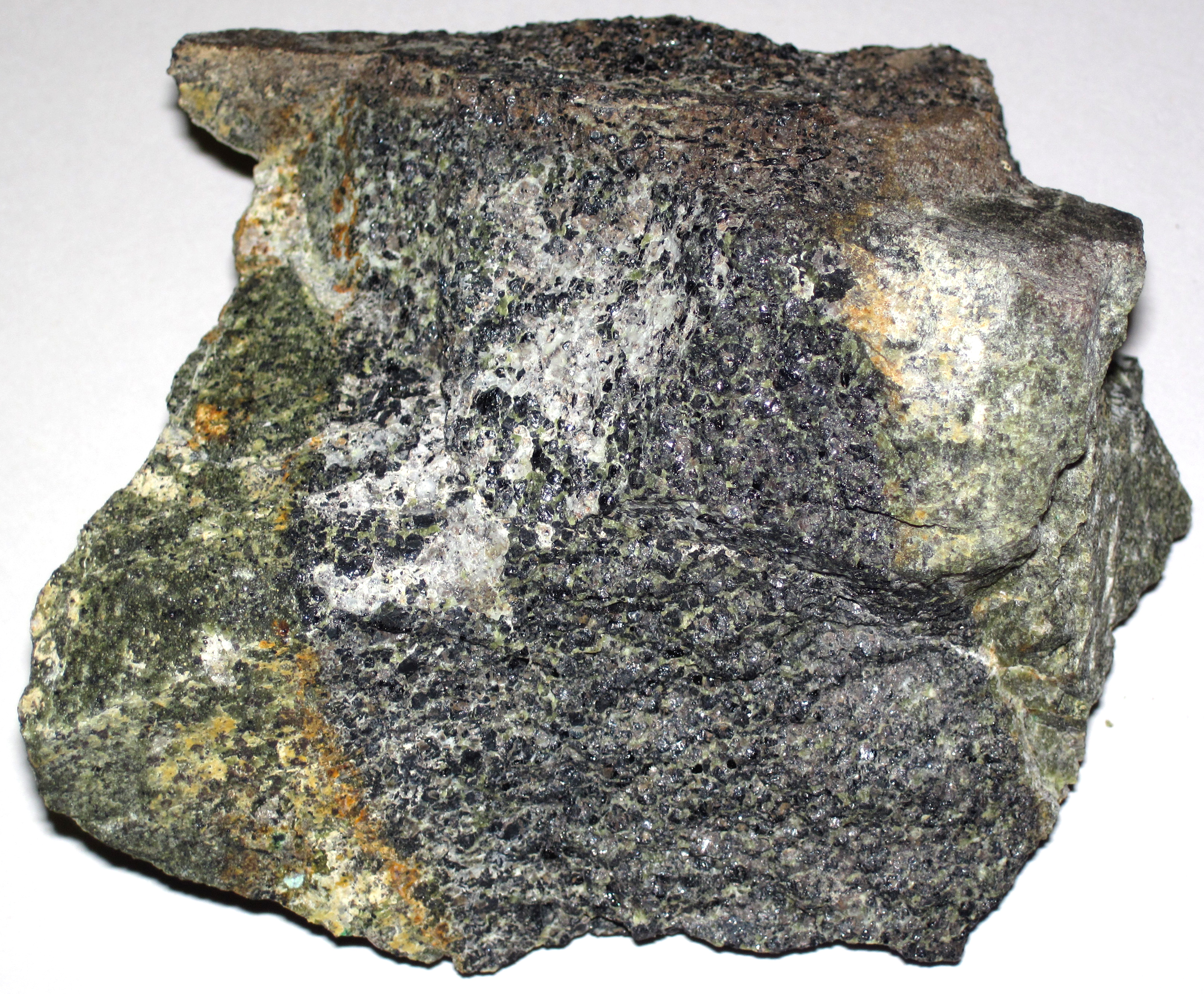
Chromitite band in chromitic serpentinite

== Applications ==
Chromite can be used as a refractory material because it has a high heat stability. The chromium extracted from chromite is used in chrome plating and alloying for production of corrosion resistant superalloys, nichrome, and stainless steel. Chromium is used as a pigment for glass, glazes, and paint, and as an oxidizing agent for tanning leather. It is also sometimes used as a gemstone. Most shiny car trim is chromium plated. Superalloys that contain chromium allow jet engines to run under high stress, in a chemically oxidizing environment, and in high-temperature situations.

=== Porcelain tile pigmentation ===
Porcelain tiles are often produced with many different colours and pigmentations. The usual contributor to colour in fast-fired porcelain tiles is black (Fe,Cr)_{2}O_{3} pigment, which is fairly expensive and is synthetic. Natural chromite allows for an inexpensive and inorganic pigmentation alternative to the expensive (Fe,Cr)_{2}O_{3} and allows for the microstructure and mechanical properties of the tiles to not be substantially altered or modified when introduced.

== Gallery ==
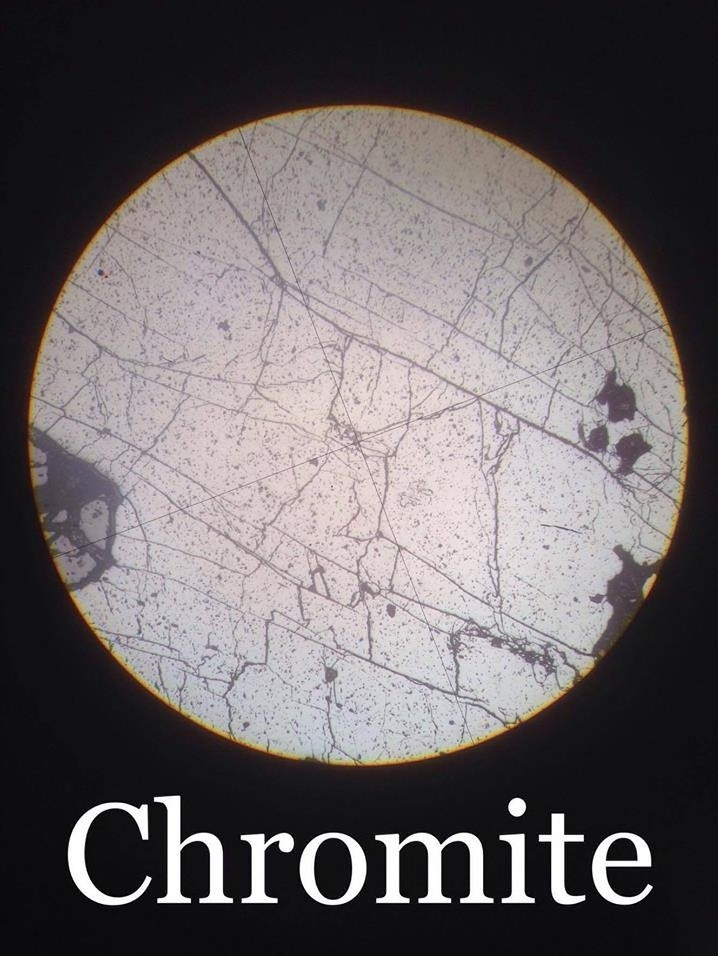
Chromite sample under a petrographic microscope in plain polarized light (PPL)

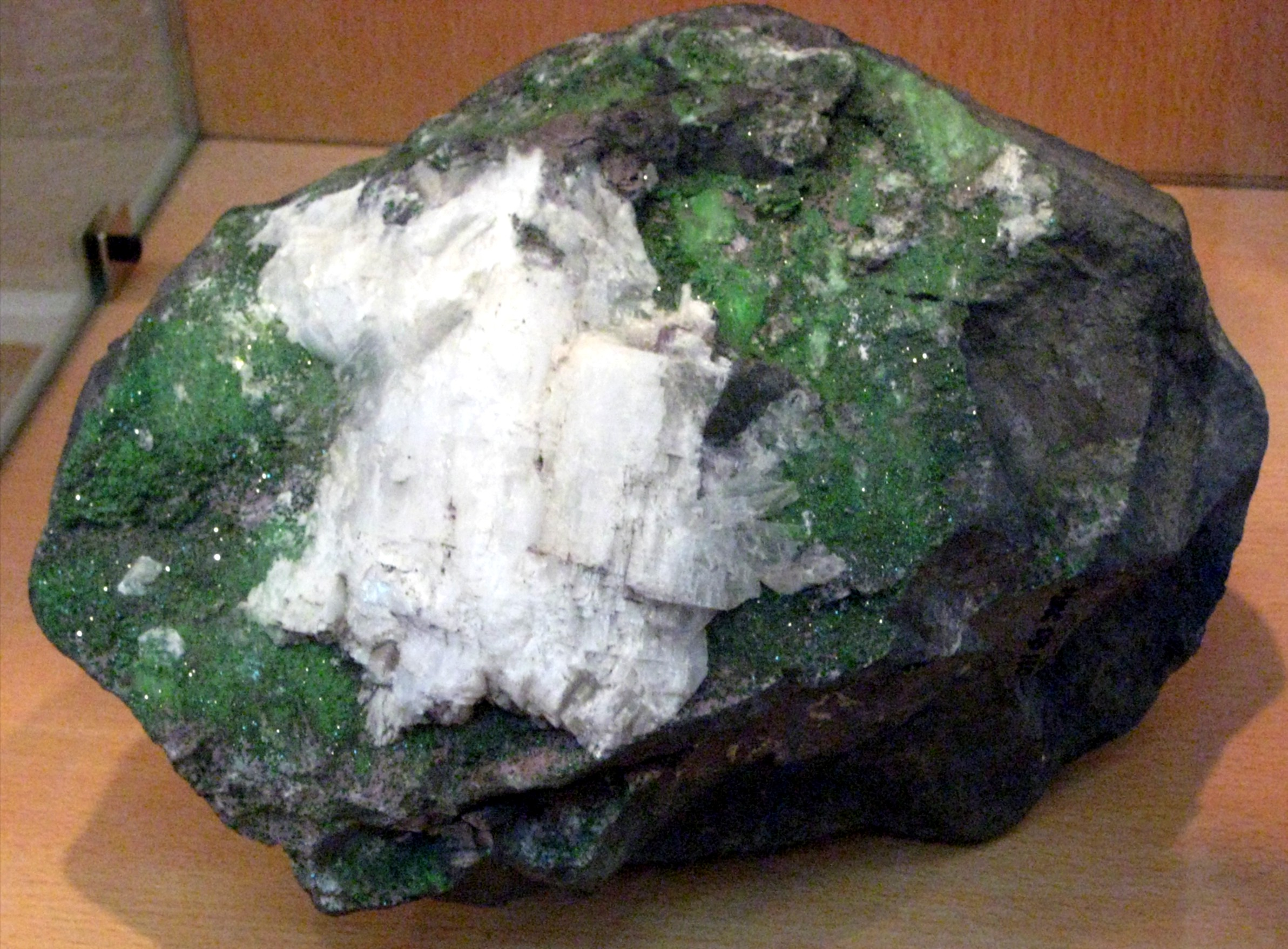
Chromite grains with white calcite grains

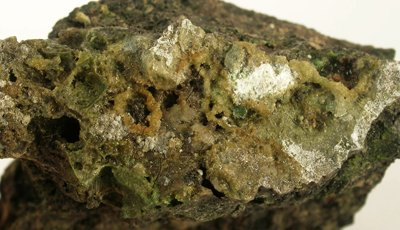
Green oxide of chromium from Baltimore, Maryland

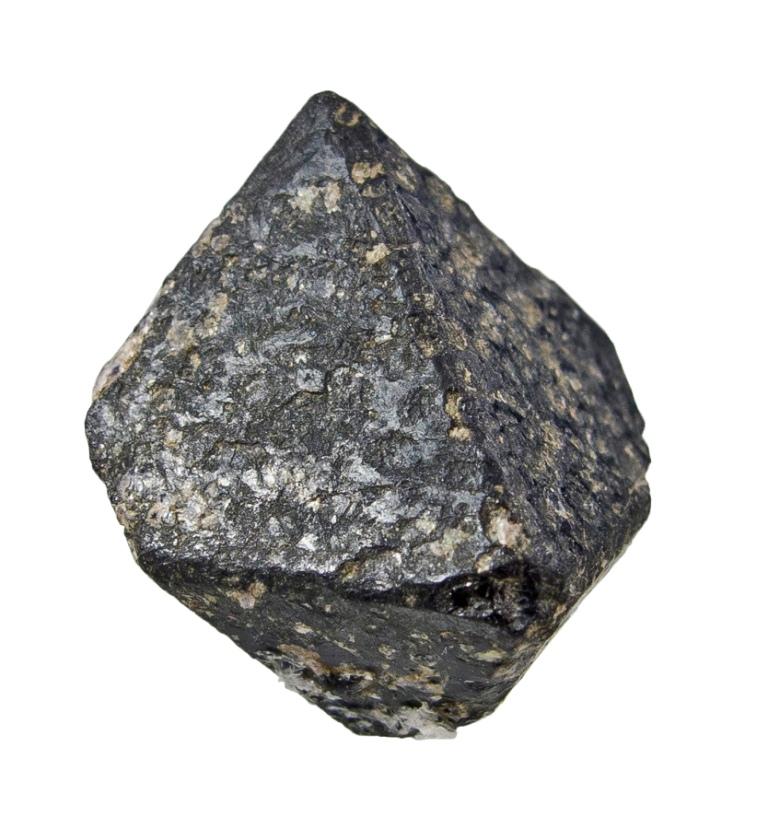
Large, equant chromite crystals from Hangha, Kenema District, Eastern Province, Sierra Leone

== See also ==
- Alloy steel
- Reduction potential
- Ring of Fire (Northern Ontario)
