= Adamant (ship) =

Several ships have been named Adamant:

- Adamant was launched in 1798. The Royal Navy purchased her in 1803 and renamed her HMS Bonetta. She had a relatively unremarkable career escorting convoys in the North Sea and Channel before she was laid up in 1807 and sold in 1810. Her new owners in 1810 returned her name to Adamant. In 1816 she carried the first free settlers to Hobart in Van Diemen's Land. From there she sailed to engage in whaling. She was last reported at Timor in 1818.
- Adamant was launched in 1804 and the Royal Navy purchased here that year and renamed her HMS Thrasher. The Navy sold her in 1814.
- Adamant (1811 ship) was launched at Blythe. She was a general trader that sailed to such places as Sierra Leone, Riga, New York, Quebec, and Australia. In 1821 she transported convicts to Sydney, New South Wales. She wrecked in 1828 on a voyage from Quebec back to London.

== See also ==
- HMS Adamant – one of three vessels of the Royal Navy
- USS Adamant – one of two minesweepers of the United States Navy
