= Scrap and Salvage =

Theatre company based in San Francisco, California

Scrap and Salvage was a theatre company based in San Francisco, California dedicated to producing site-specific work. The company existed roughly from 2002 to 2009. It was created and co-directed by James Mulligan and Rafal Klopotowski. The company was likely the only group dedicated to producing site-specific work in Northern California during that period.

The work was written/devised by an ensemble of collaborators from a variety of mediums including theatre design, architecture, installation, digital and print design, dance, and clown. Mulligan and Klopotowski were known to be adamant about their own definition of "site-specific" requiring that all material generated for performance be derived from the space in some way. The work was notable for its unique visual, physical, and musical style. Very little spoken text was used.

The company appears to have been gaining acceptance within the theatre community and was fiscally sponsored by organizations such as Coutnerpulse, Zellerbach Family Foundation and Theatre Bay Area, but for unknown reasons it was disbanded and the website was shut down.

There are differing accounts of the company's process. Some claim it changed for every production while others claim it changed every night in rehearsal. The now defunct website indicated that the shows were developed by a process of investigating the site both formally -for its physical form, and contextually, for its uses, past, stories and ghosts. The shows were devised by the group but then were apparently edited together by Mulligan and Klopotowski who acted as editors as much as directors.

== Productions ==
- Number 3 Hold - Performed on board the USS golden Bear on the bottom deck of the #3 cargo Hold, moored at the 9th avenue terminal in Oakland, CA.
- 18th and Mississippi - a short film shot in and around the Potrero Hill district of San Francisco.
- Tablesettings - performed in a food community space: BlueSpace, on Guerrero and 18th streets in San Francisco.
- 1K (this end up) - performed on the mezzanine level of the Historic 1000 Van Ness Avenue building in San Francisco.
- Day 19 - Performed in a disused hardware store on Kearney street in Chinatown, San Francisco.
- Lab Or - performed at The Lab, a gallery space on 16th and Capp st. in San Francisco
- Furnace Room - performed in the basement boiler room of a SRO hotel in the Tenderloin district of San Francisco. (It is unclear whether this performance took place - as some reports indicate that it was closed when a gas leak was found in the space.)

Due to incomplete records there may or may not have been other productions by the company.

== See also ==
- Site specific theatre
