= Vladyslav Yavorskyy =

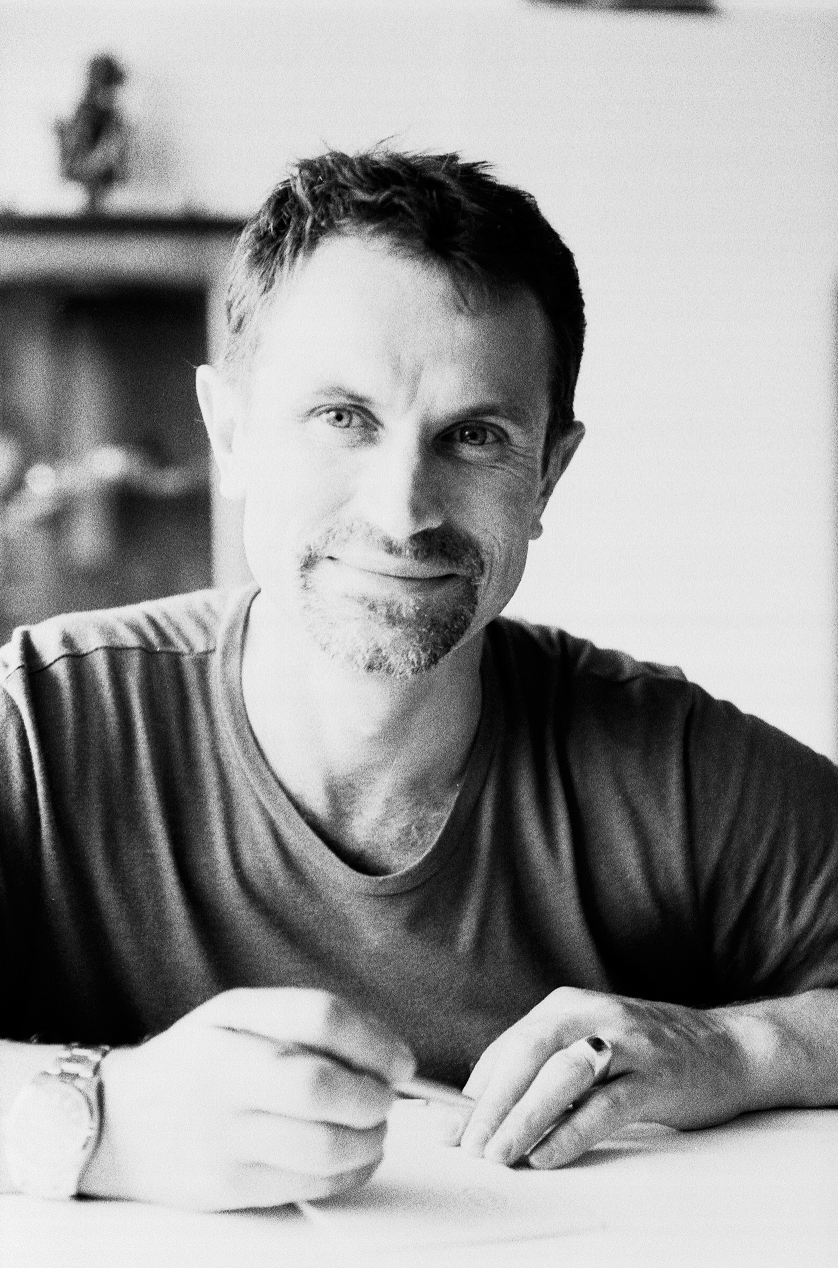
- Education: University of Odessa
- Occupations: Gemstone Dealer, Jeweler
- Years active: 1987 to present
- Known for: Yavorskyy; IVY New York
- Website: www.yavorskyy.com www.ivynewyork.com www.gemstonesbook.com

Vladyslav Yavorskyy is a gemstone dealer and jeweler based in Bali, Indonesia, United States. He is a dealer of and authorities on spinel. He is also the author of six gemstone-related books, one of which was named as one of the Best Books for Gem Lovers by JCK magazine in 2016.

Vlad Yavorskyy owns and operates IVY New York, an online jewelry store based originally in the United States, as well as Yavorskyy, his namesake business where he trades gemstones. His work has appeared in Vogue, InStyle, and Harper's Bazaar. His jewelry has also been worn by Jennifer Lopez, Taylor Swift, and Rihanna.

== Early life and education ==
Yavorskyy studied geology at the University of Odessa. While in college, he would prospect in Baikal, Siberia, Ural, Althai, far east Russia and the Pamir Mountains in the Badakhshan Province of present day Tajikistan. Starting with his arrival at college in 1987, Yavorskyy dealt in gems, mainly spinel, a little known or sought after gem at the time. He graduated from Odessa in 1992.

== Career ==
After graduating, Yavorskyy spent several years traveling and trading gemstones in Germany, Italy, and France, making a living as an independent dealer. He traveled to the United States where he opened his first office in New York in 1995. He moved to Bangkok in 1999 where he opened a gem-cutting business. Yavorskyy continued dealing primarily in spinel in his early career, concentrating on the lesser known gem as opposed to commercial stones such as rubies, sapphires, and emeralds. Throughout the years, Yavorskyy has become a specialist in a number of gems, including unheated sapphires, rubies, demantoid garnets, tsavorite garnets, and more. He has become known best for his unique cut, color, clarity and overall high standard of the stones he sells.

Yavorskyy became well-known after an increase in demand for spinel. Yavorskyy is based in South-East Asia and exhibits internationally. He possesses the world’s largest cobalt blue spinel from Luc Yen mine in Vietnam, and one of the largest red spinel weighing 110 carat.

Yavorskyy is the author of Terra Spinel, a book he self-published and printed in 2010. The book contains images that document some of his spinel finds over the years and images of mines, villages, landscapes and temples that he photographed. The original printout of this book has been sold out with the last copy sold officially at the record price of $1000 USD for the copy.

Yavorskyy released a second book, Terra Garnet, in 2014. The book was named one of the Best Jewelry and Watch Coffee-Table Books of 2014 by JCK magazine.

His third book Gemstones: Terra Connoisseur covers all fine natural colored stones, unlike the previous single-stone publications. It was published in 2017 and has become a bestseller among gemology-related publications. Gemstones: Terra Connoisseur is featured among five Best books for gem lovers by JCK magazine. A special edition of the book was later published in China in order to encourage gemological interest of Mandarin-speaking readers.

In 2018 Yavorskyy released Burma Gems. Sri Lanka Gems. The double-book set is devoted to the most historical and important gemstone countries on the planet, personally related to the author. Sri Lanka Gems Book was supported by the government of Sri Lanka and officially launched at the Facets show opening ceremony in Colombo.

The latest book of 2019 Spinel from Pamir is about the only historical mine producing red spinel in the Crown Jewels. It is accompanied by a documentary film about the life of local people in Kuh-i-Lal village, where the mining of pink and red spinel traditionally was operated.

=== Bibliography ===
Year	Title	ISBN	Notes
2010	Terra Spinel: Terra Firma	9780615409016	Co-author with Richard W. Hughes
2014	Terra Garnet	9780615925332	Author and photographer
2017	Terra Connoisseur	9780692784990	Author and photographer
2018	Burma Gems	9780692919682	Author and photographer
2018	Sri Lanka Gems	9780692121412	Author and photographer
2019	Spinel From Pamir	9781733486002	Author and photographer
