= Xieite =

Oxide mineral

General
- Category: Oxide minerals
- Formula: Fe^{2+}Cr_{2}O_{4}
- IMA symbol: Xi
- Strunz classification: 4.BB.25
- Crystal system: Orthorhombic
- Crystal class: Dipyramidal (mmm); H-M symbol: (2/m 2/m 2/m)
- Space group: Bbmm
- Unit cell: a = 9.462(6) Å b = 9.562(9) Å c = 2.916(1) Å: Z = 4

Identification
- Formula mass: 453.91 g/mol
- Color: Golden yellow
- Specific gravity: 5.63

Xieite is an iron chromium oxide mineral with formula Fe^{2+}Cr_{2}O_{4}. It is a member of the spinel group and a high pressure polymorph of chromite.

It was discovered in samples taken from the Suizhou meteorite which fell in 1986 in the Zengdu District of China.
