= Adamantius =

Adamantius or Adamantios may refer to:

== People ==
=== Only name ===
- Adamantius (Pseudo-Origen), 4th-century Christian writer
- Adamantius (physician), 5th-century Jewish physician from Alexandria
- Adamantius (praefectus urbi), 5th-century politician of the Eastern Roman Empire

=== Nickname ===
- Origen Adamantius, 3rd century early Christian theologian

=== First name ===
- Adamantios Korais (1748–1833), humanist scholar credited with laying the foundations of Modern Greek literature
- Adamantios Androutsopoulos (1919–2000), Prime Minister of Greece from 1973 to 1974
- Adamantios Sampson (fl. 1973–present), archaeologist from Rhodes

== Other ==
- Adamantius (journal), academic journal of the Italian Research Group on Origen and the Alexandrian Tradition

== See also ==
- Adeimantus (disambiguation)
