= Corundum =

Oxide mineral

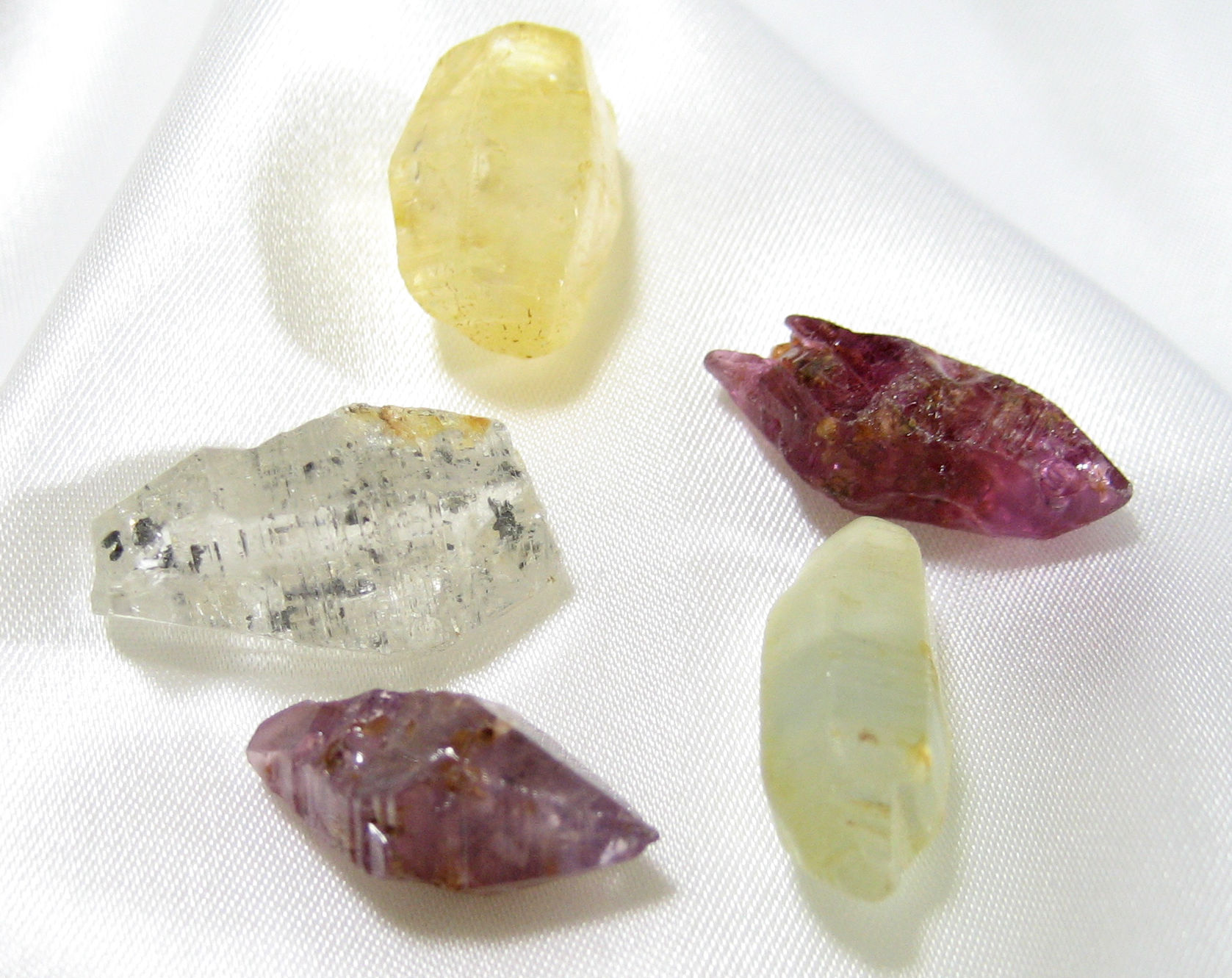

General
- Category: Oxide mineral – Hematite group
- Formula: Al_{2}O_{3}
- IMA symbol: Crn
- Strunz classification: 4.CB.05
- Dana classification: 4.3.1.1
- Crystal system: Trigonal
- Crystal class: Hexagonal scalenohedral (3̅m); H-M symbol: (3̅ 2/m)
- Space group: R3̅c (No. 167)
- Unit cell: a = 4.75 Å, c = 12.982 Å; Z = 6

Identification
- Color: Colorless, gray, golden-brown, brown; purple, pink to red, orange, yellow, green, blue, violet; may be color zoned, asteriated mainly grey and brown
- Crystal habit: Steep bipyramidal, tabular, prismatic, rhombohedral crystals, massive or granular
- Twinning: Polysynthetic twinning common
- Cleavage: None – parting in 3 directions
- Fracture: Conchoidal to uneven
- Tenacity: Brittle
- Mohs scale hardness: 9 (defining mineral)
- Luster: Adamantine to vitreous
- Streak: Colorless
- Diaphaneity: Transparent, translucent to opaque
- Specific gravity: 3.95–4.10
- Optical properties: Uniaxial (−)
- Refractive index: n_{ω} = 1.767–1.772 n_{ε} = 1.759–1.763
- Pleochroism: None
- Melting point: 2,044 °C (3,711 °F)
- Fusibility: Infusible
- Solubility: Insoluble
- Alters to: May alter to mica on surfaces causing a decrease in hardness
- Other characteristics: May fluoresce or phosphoresce under UV light

Major varieties
- Sapphire: Any color except red
- Ruby: Red
- Emery: Black granular corundum intimately mixed with magnetite, hematite, or hercynite

Corundum is a crystalline form of aluminium oxide (Al_{2}O_{3}) typically containing traces of iron, titanium, vanadium, and chromium. It is a rock-forming mineral. It is a naturally transparent material, but can have different colors depending on the presence of transition metal impurities in its crystalline structure. Corundum has two primary gem varieties: ruby and sapphire. Rubies are red due to the presence of chromium, and sapphires exhibit a range of colors depending on what transition metal is present. A rare type of sapphire, padparadscha sapphire, is pink-orange. Adamantine spar is also a variety of corundum, and is golden sheen sapphire.

The name "corundum" is derived from the Tamil-Dravidian word kurundam (ruby-sapphire) (appearing in Sanskrit as kuruvinda).

Because of corundum's hardness (pure corundum is defined to have 9.0 on the Mohs scale), it can scratch almost all other minerals. Emery, a variety of corundum with no value as a gemstone, is commonly used as an abrasive on sandpaper and on large tools used in machining metals, plastics, and wood. It is a black granular form of corundum, in which the mineral is intimately mixed with magnetite, hematite, or hercynite.

In addition to its hardness, corundum has a density of 4.02 g/cm^{3} (251 lb/cu ft), which is unusually high for a transparent mineral composed of the low-atomic mass elements aluminium and oxygen.

== Geology and occurrence ==
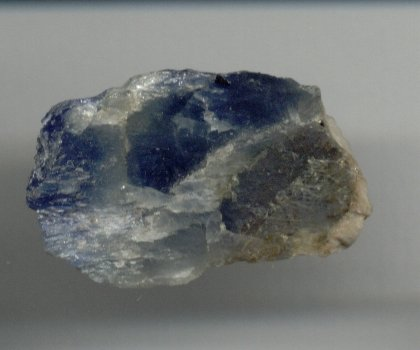
Corundum from Brazil, size about 2 cm × 3 cm (0.8 in × 1 in)

Corundum occurs as a mineral in mica schist, gneiss, and some marbles in metamorphic terranes. It also occurs in low-silica igneous syenite and nepheline syenite intrusives. Other occurrences are as masses adjacent to ultramafic intrusives, associated with lamprophyre dikes and as large crystals in pegmatites. It commonly occurs as a detrital mineral in stream and beach sands because of its hardness and resistance to weathering. The largest documented single crystal of corundum measured about 65 cm × 40 cm × 40 cm (26 in × 16 in × 16 in), and weighed 152 kg (335 lb). The record has since been surpassed by certain synthetic boules.

Corundum for abrasives is mined in Zimbabwe, Pakistan, Afghanistan, Russia, Sri Lanka, and India. Historically it was mined from deposits associated with dunites in North Carolina, US, and from a nepheline syenite in Craigmont, Ontario. Emery-grade corundum is found on the Greek island of Naxos and near Peekskill, New York, US. Abrasive corundum is synthetically manufactured from bauxite.

Four corundum axes dating to 2500 BC from the Liangzhu culture and Sanxingcun culture (the latter of which is located in Jintan District) have been discovered in China.

== Synthetic corundum ==
- In 1837, Marc Antoine Gaudin made the first synthetic rubies by reacting alumina at a high temperature with a small amount of chromium as a colourant.
- In 1847, J. J. Ebelmen made white synthetic sapphires by reacting alumina in boric acid.
- In 1877, Frenic and Freil made crystal corundum from which small stones could be cut. Frimy and Auguste Verneuil manufactured artificial ruby by fusing BaF_{2} and Al_{2}O_{3} with small quantities of chromium at temperatures above 2,000 °C (3,630 °F).
- In 1903, Verneuil announced that he could produce synthetic rubies on a commercial scale using this flame fusion process.

The flame fusion process allows the production of flawless single-crystal sapphire and ruby gems of much larger size than normally found in nature. It is also possible to grow gem-quality synthetic corundum by flux-growth and hydrothermal synthesis. Because of the simplicity of the methods involved in corundum synthesis, large quantities of these crystals have become available on the market at a fraction of the cost of natural stones.

Synthetic corundum has a lower environmental impact than natural corundum by avoiding destructive mining and conserving resources. However, its production is energy-intensive, contributing to carbon emissions if fossil fuels are used, and involves chemicals that can pose risks.

Apart from ornamental uses, synthetic corundum is also used to produce mechanical parts (tubes, rods, bearings, and other machined parts), scratch-resistant optics, scratch-resistant watch crystals, instrument windows for satellites and spacecraft (because of its transparency in the ultraviolet to infrared range), and laser components. For example, the KAGRA gravitational wave detector's main mirrors are 23 kg (50 lb) sapphires, and Advanced LIGO considered 40 kg (88 lb) sapphire mirrors. Corundum has also found use in the development of ceramic armour thanks to its high hardness.

Synthetic sapphire is also used as a substrate for growing gallium nitride for blue light-emitting diodes. The use of a low-temperature aluminium nitride buffer layer enabled the growth of high-quality gallium nitride on sapphire despite the lattice mismatch between the two materials.

== Structure and physical properties ==
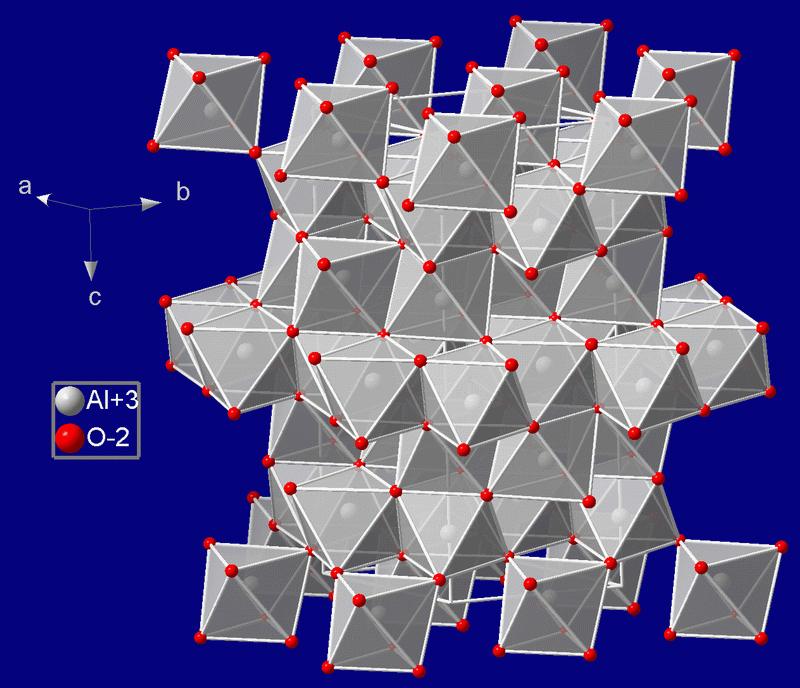
Crystal structure of corundum

Molar volume vs. pressure at room temperature

Corundum crystallizes with trigonal symmetry in the space group R3̅c and has the lattice parameters a = 4.75 Å and c = 12.982 Å at standard conditions. The unit cell contains six formula units.

The toughness of corundum is sensitive to surface roughness and crystallographic orientation. It may be 6–7 MPa·m^{1/2} for synthetic crystals, and around 4 MPa·m^{1/2} for natural.

In the lattice of corundum, the oxygen atoms form a slightly distorted hexagonal close packing, in which two-thirds of the octahedral sites between the oxygen ions are occupied by aluminium ions. The absence of aluminium ions from one of the three sites breaks the symmetry of the hexagonal close packing, reducing the space group symmetry to R3̅c and the crystal class to trigonal. The structure of corundum is sometimes described as a pseudohexagonal structure.

The Young's modulus of corundum (sapphire) has been reported by many different sources with values varying between 300 and 500 GPa, but a commonly cited value used for calculations is 345 GPa. The Young's modulus is temperature dependent, and has been reported in the [0001] direction as 435 GPa at 323 K and 386 GPa at 1,273 K. The shear modulus of corundum is 145 GPa, and the bulk modulus is 240 GPa.

Single crystal corundum fibers have potential applications in high temperature composites, and the Young's modulus is highly dependent on the crystallographic orientation along the fiber axis. The fiber exhibits a max modulus of 461 GPa when the crystallographic c-axis [0001] is aligned with the fiber axis, and minimum moduli ~373 GPa when a direction 45° away from the c-axis is aligned with the fiber axis.

The hardness of corundum measured by indentation at low loads of 1-2 N has been reported as 22-23 GPa in major crystallographic planes: (0001) (basal plane), (101̅0) (rhombohedral plane), (112̅0) (prismatic plane), and (101̅2). The hardness can drop significantly under high indentation loads. The drop with respect to load varies with the crystallographic plane due to the difference in crack resistance and propagation between directions. One extreme case is seen in the (0001) plane, where the hardness under high load (~1 kN) is nearly half the value under low load (1-2 N).

Polycrystalline corundum formed through sintering and treated with a hot isostatic press process can achieve grain sizes in the range of 0.55-0.7 μm, and has been measured to have four-point bending strength between 600 and 700 MPa and three-point bending strength between 750 and 900 MPa.

=== Structure type ===
Because of its prevalence, corundum has also become the name of a major structure type (corundum type) found in various binary and ternary compounds.

== See also ==
- Gemology
- Aluminium oxynitride
- Gemstone
- Spinel – natural and synthetic mineral often mistaken for corundum
