= Emery Tales =

- Directed by: Susanne Bausinger; Stelios Efstathopoulos
- Written by: Susanne Bausinger; Stelios Efstathopoulos
- Narrated by: Aris Gerontakis
- Cinematography: Stelios Efstathopoulos
- Edited by: Tassos Mavrogiannis
- Music by: Panos Kapernekas; Aliki Markantonatou
- Production companies: Faos TV Productions; Roll Productions (co-production)
- Release date: 20 March 2015 (Thessaloniki)
- Running time: 66 minutes
- Country: Greece
- Language: Greek

Emery Tales is a 2015 Greek documentary film written and directed by Susanne Bausinger and Stelios Efstathopoulos. Set on the island of Naxos, the film illustrates the declining emery industry in an isolated and struggling mining community.

The film premiered at the Thessaloniki Documentary Festival on March 3, 2015.

== Synopsis ==
In 2014, a group of miners try to mine as much "smyrigli", or emery, as possible in the mountain of Naxos. They are only able to mine two or three times every year. Apeiranthos, one of many communities on the island, is dwindling due to its dwellers transferring to other more beneficial places in Greece.

== Production ==
Emery Tales was written and directed by German journalist Susanne Bausinger and Greek photographer Stelios Efstathopoulos. The two had been filmmaking partners for more than two decades when they began work on the documentary in 2013, having taken notice of news reports in 2012 regarding miners going on strike on the island of Naxos. The film is a co-production of Faos TV Productions with Roll Productions, a studio founded by the film's editor.

== Release ==
Emery Tales premiered at the Thessaloniki Documentary Festival on March 3, 2015. It was also screened at the 42 Ekotopfilm Bratislava Documentary Festival on May 29, 2015, and at the World Premieres Film Festival Philippines 2015 in the "Cine Verde" section on June 30, 2015.
