= Auguste Victor Louis Verneuil =

French chemist (1856–1913)

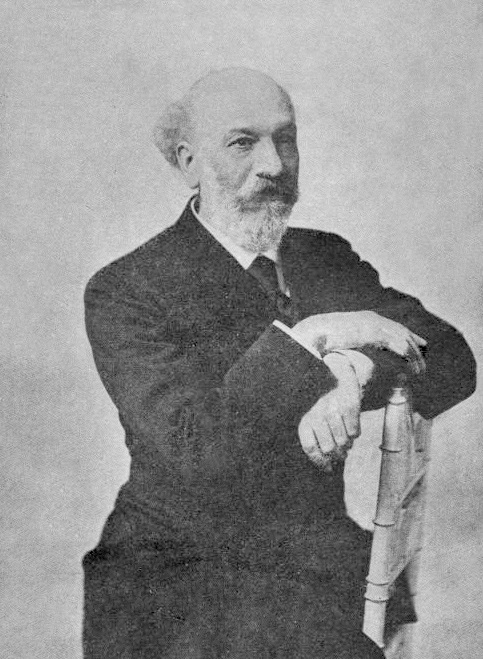
Auguste Verneuil

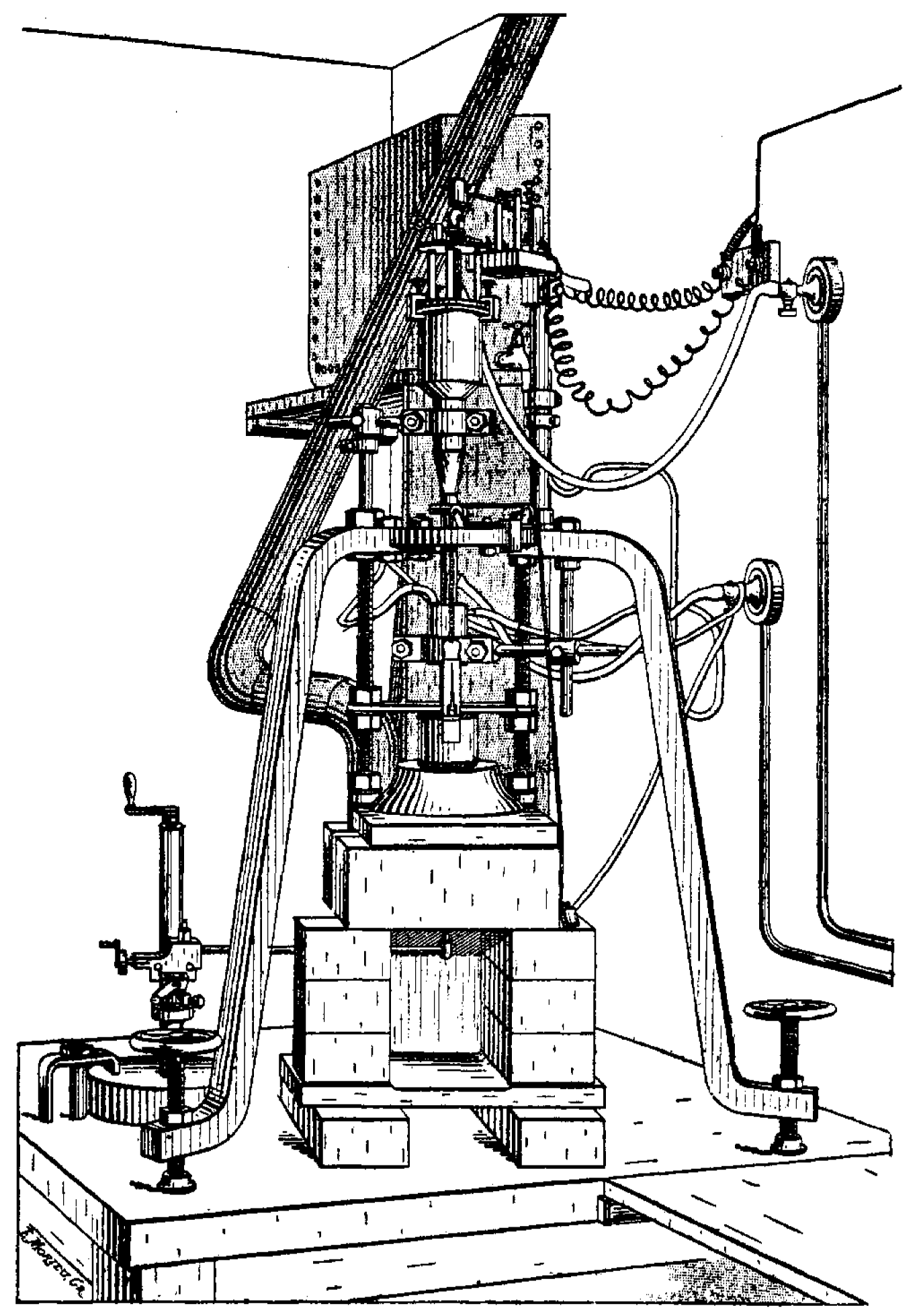
A sketch of an early furnace used by Verneuil to synthesise rubies using the Verneuil process.

Auguste Victor Louis Verneuil (French: [vɛʁnœj]; 3 November 1856 – 27 April 1913) was a French chemist who invented the first commercially viable process for the manufacture of synthetic gemstones. In 1902 he discovered the "flame fusion" process, called the Verneuil process, which is an inexpensive method of making artificial corundum, or rubies and sapphires.

== Biography ==
Verneuil was born in Dunkirk, France, in 1856. He was the son of a watchmaker-mechanic. When he was 17, chemist Edmond Frémy accepted him as a laboratory assistant. He received his bachelor's degree in 1875, his master's in 1880 and his PhD in 1886. In 1892 he became a professor of applied chemistry in the organic chemistry section of the Museum of Natural History in Paris, where he worked for 13 years. His first publication was with L. Bourgeois in 1880 on the preparation of crystalline hydrous iron arsenate. He studied methods to synthesize ruby, the chemistry of selenium, the phosphorescence of zincblende, the chemistry of rare earth elements, the purification of glycerine and the production of high refractive index glass. He also taught chemistry at various high schools and colleges.

Verneuil began working on the synthesis of rubies by flame fusion as far back as 1886 and came to a result within six years, depositing his sealed notes at the Paris Academy of Science in 1891 and 1892, but only announcing his discovery in 1902. The process which bears his name remains in use today as an inexpensive means of making artificial corundum, or rubies and sapphires.
