= Spinel group =

Mineral supergroup

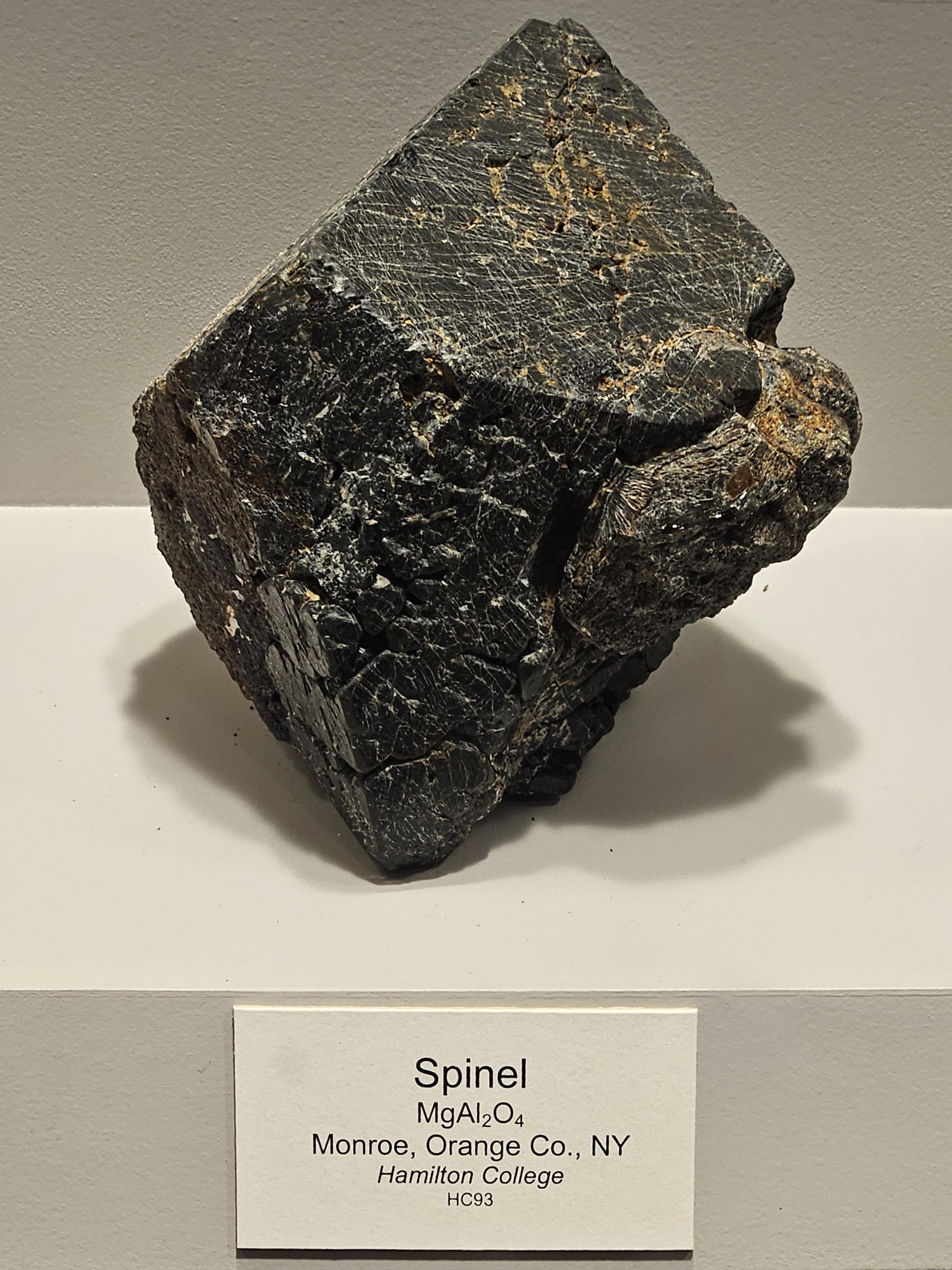
Spinel (MgAl_{2}O_{4}) on display at the New York State Museum in Albany, NY

In mineralogy, the spinels are any of a class of minerals of general formulation AB_{2}X_{4} which crystallise in the cubic (isometric) crystal system, with the X anions (typically chalcogens, like oxygen and sulfur) arranged in a close-packed cubic lattice and the cations A and B occupying some or all of the octahedral and tetrahedral sites in the lattice. Although the charges of A and B in the prototypical spinel structure are +2 and +3, respectively (A^{2+}B^{3+}_{2}X^{2−}_{4}), other combinations incorporating divalent, trivalent, or tetravalent cations, including magnesium, zinc, iron, manganese, aluminium, chromium, titanium, and silicon, are also possible. The anion is normally oxygen; when other chalcogenides constitute the anion sublattice the structure is referred to as a thiospinel.

A and B can also be the same metal with different valences, as is the case with magnetite, Fe_{3}O_{4} (as Fe^{2+}Fe^{3+}_{2}O^{2−}_{4}), which is the most abundant member of the spinel group. It is even possible for them to be alloys, as seen for example in LiNi_{0.5}Mn_{1.5}O_{4}, a material used in some high energy density lithium ion batteries. Spinels are grouped in series by the B cation.

The group is named for spinel (MgAl_{2}O_{4}), which was once known as "spinel ruby". (Today the term ruby is used only for corundum.)

== Spinel group members ==
Members of the spinel group include:

- Aluminium spinels:
  - Spinel: MgAl_{2}O_{4}, after which this class of minerals is named
  - Gahnite: ZnAl_{2}O_{4}
  - Hercynite: FeAl_{2}O_{4}
  - Galaxite: MnAl_{2}O_{4}
  - Pleonaste: (Mg,Fe)Al_{2}O_{4}
- Iron spinels:
  - Cuprospinel: CuFe_{2}O_{4}
  - Franklinite: (Fe,Mn,Zn)(Fe,Mn)_{2}O_{4}
  - Jacobsite: MnFe_{2}O_{4}
  - Magnesioferrite: MgFe_{2}O_{4}
  - Magnetite: FeFe_{2}O_{4}, where one Fe is +2 and two Fe's are +3, respectively.
  - Trevorite: NiFe_{2}O_{4}
  - Ulvöspinel: TiFe_{2}O_{4}
  - Zinc ferrite: (Zn,Fe)Fe_{2}O_{4}
- Chromium spinels:
  - Chromite: FeCr_{2}O_{4}
  - Magnesiochromite: MgCr_{2}O_{4}
  - Zincochromite: ZnCr_{2}O_{4}
- Cobalt spinels:
  - Manganesecobaltite: Mn_{1.5}Co_{1.5}O_{4}
- Vanadium spinels:
  - Coulsonite: FeV_{2}O_{4}
  - Magnesiocoulsonite: MgV_{2}O_{4}
- Others with the spinel structure:
  - Ringwoodite: (Mg,Fe)_{2}SiO_{4}, an abundant olivine polymorph within the Earth's mantle from about 520 to 660 km depth, and a rare mineral in meteorites
  - Musgravite: Be(Mg,Fe,Zn)_{2}Al_{6}O_{12} a type of "multi-spinel".

There are many more compounds with a spinel structure, e.g. the thiospinels and selenospinels, that can be synthesized in the lab or in some cases occur as minerals.

The heterogeneity of spinel group members varies based on composition with ferrous and magnesium based members varying greatly as in solid solution, which requires similarly sized cations. However, ferric and aluminium based spinels are almost entirely homogeneous due to their large size difference.

== The spinel structure ==
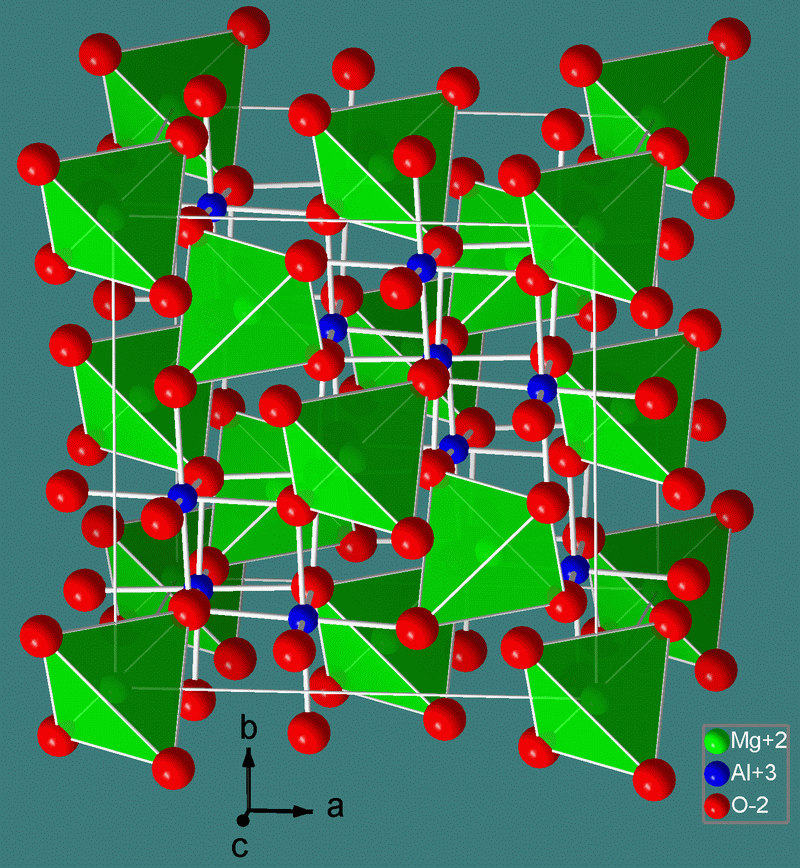
Crystal structure of spinel

The primary spinel space group is Fd3̅m (the Diamond cubic structure), which has been historically attributed to the prototypical spinel, MgAl_{2}O_{4}. However, precise x-ray diffraction experiments on MgAl_{2}O_{4} have revealed reflections which are forbidden in Fd3̅m, suggesting that it is correctly described as the lower symmetry F4̅3m.

In normal spinel structures, oxygen ions form a face-centred cubic lattice with eight tetrahedral and four octahedral sites per formula unit (32 anion, 32 octahedral, and 64 tetrahedral sites per unit cell). The tetrahedral spaces are smaller than the octahedral spaces. B ions occupy half of the octahedral sites, while A ions occupy one-eighth of the tetrahedral sites. The mineral spinel MgAl_{2}O_{4} has a normal spinel structure.

In a normal spinel structure, the ions are in the following positions, where i, j, and k are arbitrary integers and δ, ε, and ζ are small real numbers (note that the unit cell can be chosen differently, giving different coordinates):

$$\begin{align}
& \text{X:} \quad \begin{array}{lcrcccc}
\Bigl( \tfrac14-\delta, & \delta, & \delta\quad \Bigr) & + & \Bigl( \tfrac12(i+j), & \tfrac12(j+k), & \tfrac12(i+k) \Bigr) \\
\Bigl( \quad\delta, & \tfrac14-\delta, & \delta\quad \Bigr) & + & \Bigl( \tfrac12(i+j), & \tfrac12(j+k), & \tfrac12(i+k) \Bigr) \\
\Bigl(\quad\delta, & \delta, & \tfrac14-\delta \Bigr) & + & \Bigl( \tfrac12(i+j), & \tfrac12(j+k), & \tfrac12(i+k) \Bigr) \\
\Bigl( \tfrac14-\delta, & \tfrac14-\delta, & \tfrac14-\delta \Bigr) & + & \Bigl( \tfrac12(i+j), & \tfrac12(j+k), & \tfrac12(i+k) \Bigr) \\
\Bigl( \tfrac34+\varepsilon, & \tfrac12-\varepsilon, & \tfrac12-\varepsilon \Bigr) & + & \Bigl( \tfrac12(i+j), & \tfrac12(j+k), & \tfrac12(i+k) \Bigr) \\
\Bigl( 1-\varepsilon, & \tfrac14+\varepsilon, & \tfrac12-\varepsilon \Bigr) & + & \Bigl( \tfrac12(i+j), & \tfrac12(j+k), & \tfrac12(i+k) \Bigr) \\
\Bigl( 1-\varepsilon, & \tfrac12-\varepsilon, & \tfrac14+\varepsilon \Bigr) & + & \Bigl( \tfrac12(i+j), & \tfrac12(j+k), & \tfrac12(i+k) \Bigr) \\
\Bigl( \tfrac34+\varepsilon, & \tfrac14+\varepsilon, & \tfrac14+\varepsilon \Bigr) & + & \Bigl( \tfrac12(i+j), & \tfrac12(j+k), & \tfrac12(i+k) \Bigr) \\
\end{array} \\[10pt]
& \text{A:} \quad \begin{array}{ccccc}
\Bigl( \tfrac18, & \tfrac18, & \tfrac18 \Bigr) & + & \Bigl( \tfrac12(i+j), & \tfrac12(j+k), & \tfrac12(i+k) \Bigr) \\
\Bigl( \tfrac78, & \tfrac38, & \tfrac38 \Bigr) & + & \Bigl( \tfrac12(i+j), & \tfrac12(j+k), & \tfrac12(i+k) \Bigr) \\
\end{array} \\[10pt]
& \text{B:} \quad \begin{array}{ccrcccc}
\Bigl( \tfrac12+\zeta, & \zeta, & \zeta\quad \Bigr) & + & \Bigl( \tfrac12(i+j), & \tfrac12(j+k), & \tfrac12(i+k) \Bigr) \\
\Bigl( \tfrac12+\zeta, & \tfrac14-\zeta, & \tfrac14-\zeta \Bigr) & + & \Bigl( \tfrac12(i+j), & \tfrac12(j+k), & \tfrac12(i+k) \Bigr) \\
\Bigl( \tfrac34-\zeta, & \tfrac14-\zeta, & \zeta\quad \Bigr) & + & \Bigl( \tfrac12(i+j), & \tfrac12(j+k), & \tfrac12(i+k) \Bigr) \\
\Bigl( \tfrac34-\zeta, & \zeta, & \tfrac14-\zeta \Bigr) & + & \Bigl( \tfrac12(i+j), & \tfrac12(j+k), & \tfrac12(i+k) \Bigr)
\end{array}
\end{align}$$

The first four X positions form a tetrahedron around the first A position, and the last four form one around the second A position. When the space group is Fd3̅m then δ=ε and ζ=0. In this case, a three-fold rotoinversion with axis in the 111 direction is centred on the point (0, 0, 0) (where there is no ion) and can also be centred on the B ion at (1/2, 1/2, 1/2), and in fact every B ion is the centre of a three-fold rotoinversion (point group D_{3d}). Under this space group the two A positions are equivalent. If the space group is F4̅3m then the three-fold rotoinversions become simple three-fold rotations (point group C_{3v}) because the inversion disappears, and the two A positions are no longer equivalent.

Every ion is on at least three mirror planes and at least one three-fold rotation axis. The structure has tetrahedral symmetry around each A ion, and the A ions are arranged just like the carbon atoms in diamond. There are another eight tetrahedral sites per unit cell that are empty, each one surrounded by a tetrahedron of B as well as a tetrahedron of X ions.

Inverse spinel structures have a different cation distribution in that all of the A cations and half of the B cations occupy octahedral sites, while the other half of the B cations occupy tetrahedral sites. An example of an inverse spinel is Fe_{3}O_{4}, if the Fe^{2+} (A^{2+}) ions are d^{6} high-spin and the Fe^{3+} (B^{3+}) ions are d^{5} high-spin.

In addition, intermediate cases exist where the cation distribution can be described as (A_{1−x}B_{x})[A_{x/2}B_{1−x/2}]_{2}O_{4}, where parentheses () and brackets [] are used to denote tetrahedral and octahedral sites, respectively. The so-called inversion degree, x, adopts values between 0 (normal) and 1 (inverse), and is equal to 2/3 for a completely random cation distribution.

The cation distribution in spinel structures are related to the crystal field stabilization energies (CFSE) of the constituent transition metals. Some ions may have a distinct preference for the octahedral site depending on the d-electron count. If the A^{2+} ions have a strong preference for the octahedral site, they will displace half of the B^{3+} ions from the octahedral sites to tetrahedral sites. Similarly, if the B^{3+} ions have a low or zero octahedral site stabilization energy (OSSE), then they will occupy tetrahedral sites, leaving octahedral sites for the A^{2+} ions.

Burdett and co-workers proposed an alternative treatment of the problem of spinel inversion, using the relative sizes of the s and p atomic orbitals of the two types of atom to determine their site preferences. This is because the dominant stabilizing interaction in the solids is not the crystal field stabilization energy generated by the interaction of the ligands with the d electrons, but the σ-type interactions between the metal cations and the oxide anions. This rationale can explain anomalies in the spinel structures that crystal-field theory cannot, such as the marked preference of Al^{3+} cations for octahedral sites or of Zn^{2+} for tetrahedral sites, which crystal field theory would predict neither has a site preference. Only in cases where this size-based approach indicates no preference for one structure over another do crystal field effects make any difference; in effect they are just a small perturbation that can sometimes affect the relative preferences, but which often do not.

== Common uses in industry and technology ==
Spinels commonly form in high temperature processes. Either native oxide scales of metals, or intentional deposition of spinel coatings can be used to protect base metals from oxidation or corrosion. The presence of spinels may hereby serve as thin (few micrometer thick) functional layers, that prevent the diffusion of oxygen (or other atmospheric) ions or specific metal ions such as chromium, which otherwise exhibits a fast diffusion process at high temperatures.

=== Magnetoelectric and multiferroic properties of spinels ===
It is widely known that magnetism and electricity are interrelated from Maxwell's equations. However, these properties are usually studied independently in materials. These special materials exhibit Magnetoelectric effect such that there is a linear coupling between electric and magnetic fields, with the first of its kind being Cr_{2}O_{3}. The magnetoelectric behaviour of spinel oxides can be understood by starting from the basic idea of ferroelectricity. A ferroelectric material develops electric polarization that can be reversed by an external electric field, usually because small ionic shifts break inversion symmetry in the crystal structure. Multiferroics combine electric order with magnetic order. In many spinel oxides, the polarization does not already exist but only appears after a particular magnetic structure forms, placing them among type-II multiferroics where magnetism creates the polar state.

The magnetoelectric effect requires the simultaneous breaking of inversion symmetry and time-reversal symmetry. Spinels crystallize in the centrosymmetric space group Fd3̅m, but their magnetic structures often break inversion symmetry even when the lattice does not. This is connected to the spinel B-site sublattice, which forms a pyrochlore network of corner-sharing tetrahedra, a geometry known for strong magnetic frustration. Because a simple up–down antiferromagnetic order is impossible, spins often form spirals, helices, or canted states that remove inversion symmetry, allowing magnetically induced ferroelectricity.

Two main microscopic mechanisms explain how magnetic structures produce polarization in spinels. The first is the inverse Dzyaloshinskii–Moriya mechanism, where non-collinear spins generate a local electric dipole proportional to the spiral's chirality. The second is exchange striction, where parallel and antiparallel spin pairs refer different bond lengths; an asymmetric arrangement of these distortions generates a net polarization. In vanadium spinels, orbital ordering of the V^{3+} ions further modifies the lattice and enhances this mechanism.

Several examples highlight these mechanisms. In CoCr_{2}O_{4}, a conical spin spiral forms below about 26 K and produces a ferroelectric polarization whose sign reverses with the chirality of the spiral. In ZnCr_{2}Se_{4}, a long-wavelength helical magnet produces a magnetic-field-tunable polarization, illustrating continuous magnetoelectric control. Vanadium spinels such as MnV_{2}O_{4} display strong coupling between lattice distortion, orbital order, and spin arrangement, producing multiferroicity through cooperative exchange striction.

Spin–phonon coupling also plays a central role. Phonon anomalies detected in Raman or infrared spectra at magnetic transition temperatures show that lattice vibrations are strongly affected by spin ordering. These effects demonstrate how the crystallographic structure, magnetic frustration, and non-collinear ordering in spinels work together to produce magnetoelectric and multiferroic behaviour.

=== Thermo-electric (thermochromic) properties of spinels ===
Some AB_{2}O_{4} spinels exhibit thermochromism.

Thermochromism of spinels; AB_{2}O_{4}
| Systematic name ↓ & molecular formula | Thermochromism (Y/N, Intensity) |
|---|---|
| Copper aluminate; CuAl₂O₄ | N→x |
| Copper chromite; CuCr₂O₄ | Y→+ |
| Copper ferrite; CuFe_{2}O_{4} | Y→+++ |
| Magnesio chromite; MgCr_{2}O_{4} | Y→+ |
| Magnesio ferrite; MgFe_{2}O_{4} | Y→+ |
| Magnesio spinel; MgAl₂O₄ | N→x |
| Zinc aluminate; ZnAl₂O₄ | N→x |
| Zinc chromite; ZnCr₂O₄ | Y→+ |
| Zinc ferrite; ZnFe_{2}O_{4} | Y→++ |

The table below is ordered in descending order, in regards to thermochromism of +II-cations Cu²⁺ ↑ > Zn²⁺ > Mg²⁺ ↓ & +III-cations Fe³⁺ ↑ > Cr³⁺ > Al³⁺ ↓.

Thermochromism of cations in AB₂O₄
| A²⁺/B³⁺ | Fe³⁺ ↑ | Cr³⁺ | Al³⁺ ↓ |
|---|---|---|---|
| Cu²⁺ ↑ | CuFe₂O₄→+++ | CuCr₂O₄ →+ | CuAl₂O₄ →x |
| Zn²⁺ | ZnFe_{2}O_{4}→++ | ZnCr₂O₄ →+ | ZnAl₂O₄ →x |
| Mg²⁺ ↓ | MgFe₂O₄ →+ | MgCr₂O₄ →+ | MgAl₂O₄ →x |
