= Ferrochrome =

Alloy of chromium and iron

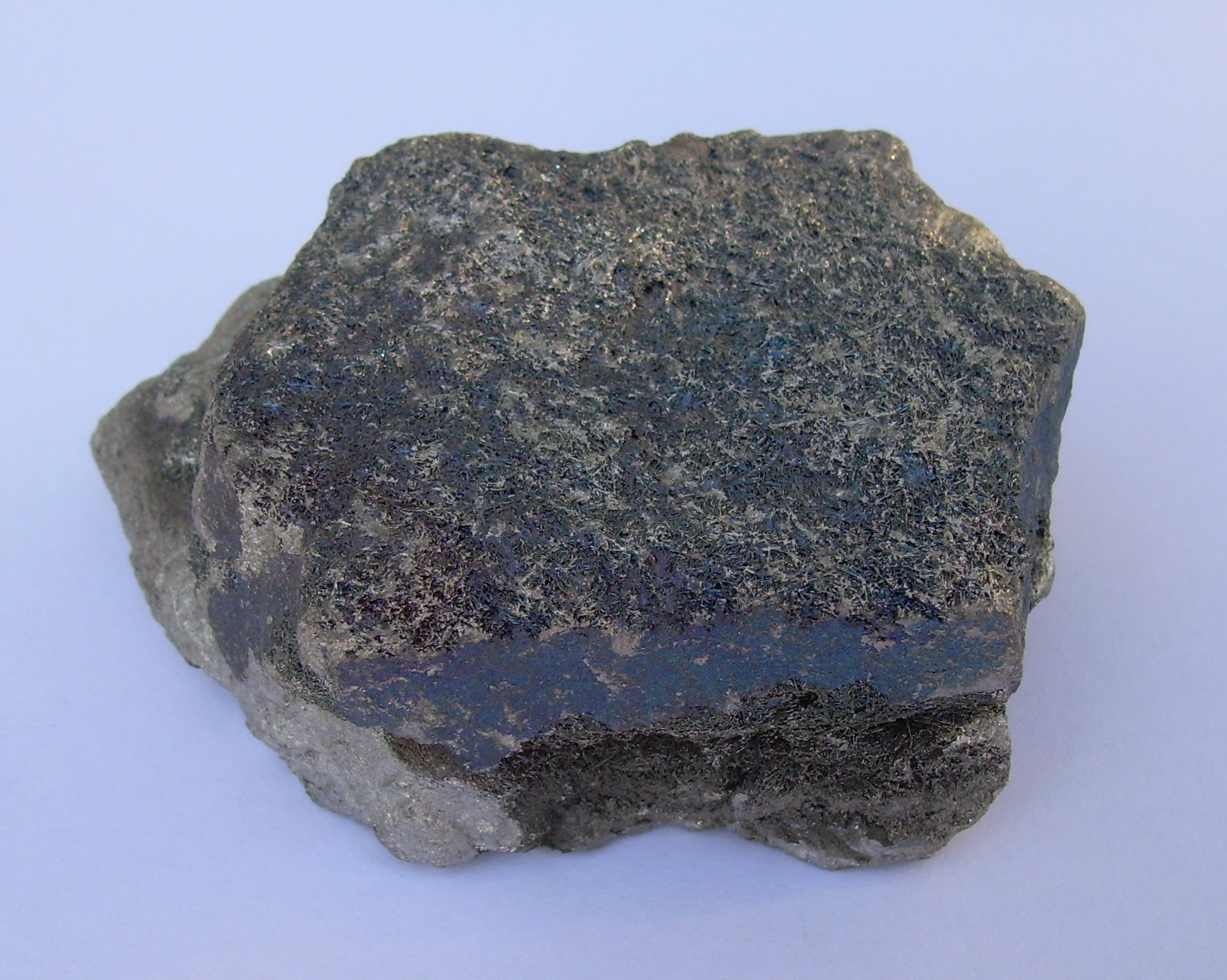
Ferrochrome alloy

Ferrochrome or ferrochromium (FeCr) is a type of ferroalloy, that is, an alloy of chromium and iron, generally containing 50 to 70% chromium by weight.

Ferrochrome is produced by electric arc carbothermic reduction of chromite. Most of the global output is produced in South Africa, Kazakhstan and India, which have large domestic chromite resources. Increasing amounts are coming from Russia and China. Production of steel, especially that of stainless steel with chromium content of 10 to 20%, is the largest consumer and the main application of ferrochrome.

== Usage ==
Over 80% of the world's ferrochrome is utilised in the production of stainless steel. In 2006, 28,000,000 tons of stainless steel were produced. Stainless steel depends on chromium for its appearance and resistance to corrosion. Average chrome content in stainless steel is approx. 18%. It is also used to add chromium to carbon steel. FeCr from South Africa, known as "charge chrome" and produced from a Cr containing ore with a low carbon content, is most commonly used in stainless steel production. Alternatively, high carbon FeCr produced from high-grade ore found in Kazakhstan (among other places) is more commonly used in specialist applications such as engineering steels where a high Cr/Fe ratio and minimum levels of other elements (sulfur, phosphorus, titanium etc.) are important and production of finished metals takes place in small electric arc furnaces compared to large scale blast furnaces. In the past, Ferrochrome alloys were used in the formulation of Type III Compact Cassettes.

== Production ==
Ferrochrome production is essentially a carbothermic reduction operation taking place at high temperatures. Chromite (an oxide of Cr and Fe) is reduced by coal and coke to form the iron-chromium alloy. The heat for this reaction can come from several forms, but typically from the electric arc formed between the tips of electrodes in the bottom of the furnace and the furnace hearth. This arc creates temperatures of about 2,800 °C (5,070 °F). In the process of smelting, huge amounts of electricity are consumed, making production very expensive in countries where power costs are high.

Tapping of the material from the furnace takes place intermittently. When enough smelted ferrochrome has accumulated in the furnace hearth, the tap hole is drilled open and a stream of molten metal and slag rushes down a trough into a chill or ladle. Ferrochrome solidifies in large castings which are crushed for sale or further processed.

Ferrochrome is generally classified by the amount of carbon and chrome it contains. The vast majority of FeCr produced is "charge chrome" from South Africa, with high carbon being the second largest segment followed by the smaller sectors of low carbon and intermediate carbon material.

== Trading ==
In March 2021, the Shanghai Futures Exchange decided that it would list ferrochrome futures at some unknown date. At the time, ferrochrome spot 6–8% C, basis 50% Cr, ddp China was trading at $1,336–1,382. In January 2021 the spot price had been 25% lower.
