= Magnesioferrite =

Magnesium iron oxide mineral

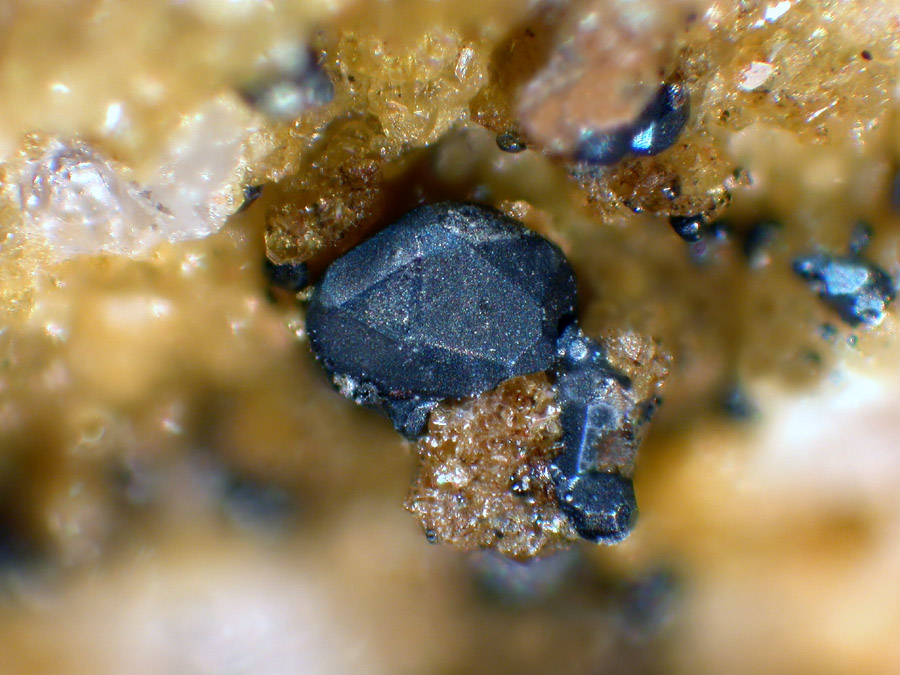
- Magnesioferrite from Ochtendung, Eifel, Germany

General
- Category: Oxide minerals Spinel group Spinel structural group
- Formula: Mg(Fe^{3+})_{2}O_{4}
- IMA symbol: Mfr
- Strunz classification: 4.BB.05
- Crystal system: Cubic
- Crystal class: Hexoctahedral (m3̅m); H-M symbol: (4/m 3̅ 2/m)
- Space group: Fd3̅m
- Unit cell: a = 8.3866 Å; Z = 8

Identification
- Color: Black to brownish black
- Crystal habit: As octahedral crystals, massive granular
- Twinning: Twin plane {111}, contact twins
- Cleavage: On {111}
- Fracture: Uneven
- Tenacity: Brittle
- Mohs scale hardness: 6 - 6.5
- Luster: Metallic, semimetallic, dull
- Streak: Dark red
- Diaphaneity: Opaque, transparent in thin fragments
- Specific gravity: 4.55 – 4.65 measured
- Optical properties: Isotropic
- Refractive index: n = 2.38
- Other characteristics: Magnetic

Magnesioferrite is a magnesium iron oxide mineral, a member of the magnetite series of spinels. Magnesioferrite crystallizes as black metallic octahedral crystals. It is named after its chemical composition of magnesium and ferric iron. The density is 4.6 - 4.7 (average = 4.65), and the diaphaniety is opaque. Occurs as well-formed fine sized crystals or massive and granular. Its hardness is 6-6.5. It has a metallic luster and a dark red streak.

== Occurrence ==
It occurs in fumaroles, as a result of combustion metamorphism and coal seam fires, in glass spherules related to meteorite impacts, and as accessory phase in kimberlites and carbonatites.

It has been reported from Vesuvius and Stromboli, Italy.
