= Ulvöspinel =

Iron titanium oxide mineral

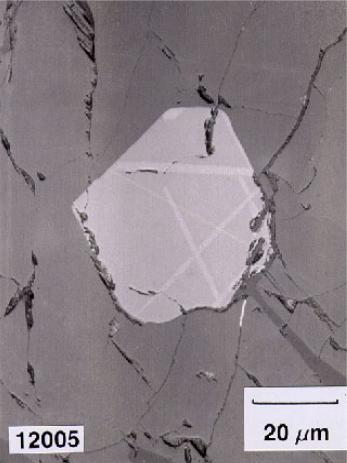
- Ulvöspinel from Apollo 12 landing site, Oceanus Procellarum (Ocean of Storms)

General
- Category: Oxide minerals Spinel group Spinel structural group
- Formula: TiFe^{2+}_{2}O_{4}
- IMA symbol: Uspl
- Strunz classification: 4.BB.05
- Crystal system: Cubic
- Crystal class: Hexoctahedral (m3̅m); H-M symbol: (4/m 3̅ 2/m)
- Space group: Fd3̅m

Identification
- Color: Iron-black, brown in reflected light
- Crystal habit: Commonly as an exsolution in magnetite
- Tenacity: brittle
- Mohs scale hardness: 5.5 – 6.0
- Luster: Metallic
- Diaphaneity: Opaque
- Specific gravity: 4.78

Ulvöspinel or ulvite is an iron titanium oxide mineral with formula Fe_{2}TiO_{4} or TiFe^{2+}_{2}O_{4}. It forms brown to black metallic isometric crystals with a Mohs hardness of 5.5 to 6. It belongs to the spinel group of minerals, as does magnetite, Fe_{3}O_{4}.

Ulvöspinel forms as solid solutions with magnetite at high temperatures and reducing conditions, and grains crystallized from some basalt-gabbro magmas are rich in the ulvöspinel component. The ulvöspinel component tends to oxidize to magnetite plus ilmenite during subsolidus cooling of the host rocks, and the ilmenite so produced may form apparent exsolution (trellis type) laminae in magnetite. The texture was once interpreted as indicating solid solution between ilmenite and magnetite, until the oxidation reaction and resultant textures were reproduced in laboratory experiments first described by Buddington and Lindsley (1964, Journal of Petrology 5, p. 310–357). The results are important to plate tectonics because magnetite is an important recorder of rock magnetism.

Ulvöspinel was first described by Fredrik Mogensen (1904–1978) from a dolerite layered intrusion in the Ulvö Islands, Ångermanland, Sweden in 1943. The locality is an iron, titanium and vanadium mining area that has been active since the 17th century. It is common in titaniferous magnetite iron ore deposits. It also occurs in kimberlites, in some reduced iron-bearing basalts and is common in lunar basalts.
