= Adamantius (journal) =

- Discipline: Christian literature; Judaeo‑Hellenistic studies; Patristics
- Language: Italian, English
- Edited by: Lorenzo Perrone (Direttore responsabile) / Alberto Camplani (Scientific Director)

Publication details
- Former name: Bolletino del Gruppo Italiana di Ricerca su Origene e la Tradizione Alessandrina
- Publisher: Editrice Morcelliana (Italy)
- Frequency: Annual
- Open access: no

Standard abbreviations
- ISO 4: Adamantius

Indexing
- ISSN: 1126-6244 (print); 2612-6710 (web)
- OCLC no.: 941663065

Links
- Journal homepage

Adamantius is a peer-reviewed academic journal focusing on early Christian literature and Judaeo-Hellenistic studies, with particular attention to the Alexandrian theologian Origen (c. 184 – c. 253). Its title derives from Origen’s Greek cognomen, Adamantios, meaning "adamant" or "unbreakable".

== History ==
The journal was founded in 1995 (originally under the title Bollettino del Gruppo Italiano di Ricerca su Origene e la Tradizione Alessandrina) by the Italian Research Group on Origen and the Alexandrian Tradition (GIROTA). Initially, it aimed to provide a forum for research related to Origen and his tradition. In 2001, GIROTA was formally established, and *Adamantius* became its official publication. Over time, the journal expanded its scope to cover broader Judaeo-Hellenistic studies and related early Christian literature.

== Editorial Board ==
The editorial board includes scholars such as Professor Alberto Camplani (Scientific Director) and Professor Lorenzo Perrone (Editor-in-Chief, direttore responsabile). The board comprises Italian and international academics who oversee the journal’s peer-review process and maintain its academic standards.

== Abstracting and indexing ==
- Adamantius* is abstracted and indexed in ERIH PLUS, Academic Search Ultimate, IBZ Online, and the Emerging Sources Citation Index. It is also listed in WorldCat and the MIAR.
