= Adamantine (veneer) =

Veneer developed in 1880

Adamantine is a veneer developed by The Celluloid Manufacturing Company of New York City, covered by U.S. Patent number 232,037, dated September 7, 1880, for the process of cementing a celluloid veneer or coating to a substrate such as a wood case. Adamantine veneer was made in black and white, and in colored patterns that simulated wood grain, onyx and marble.

Expensive French mantel clocks in slate, onyx or marble cases were popular in the United States in the 1860s. American clock manufacturers produced similar looking cases made of iron or wood, known as "Black Mantel Clocks", which were popular from 1880 to 1931.

Seth Thomas Clock Company purchased the right to use the adamantine veneer in 1881, which they called Marbaline. Their "Adamantine" black mantel clocks were made starting in 1882.
