= Golden sheen sapphire =

Gold/Golden Sheen Sapphire
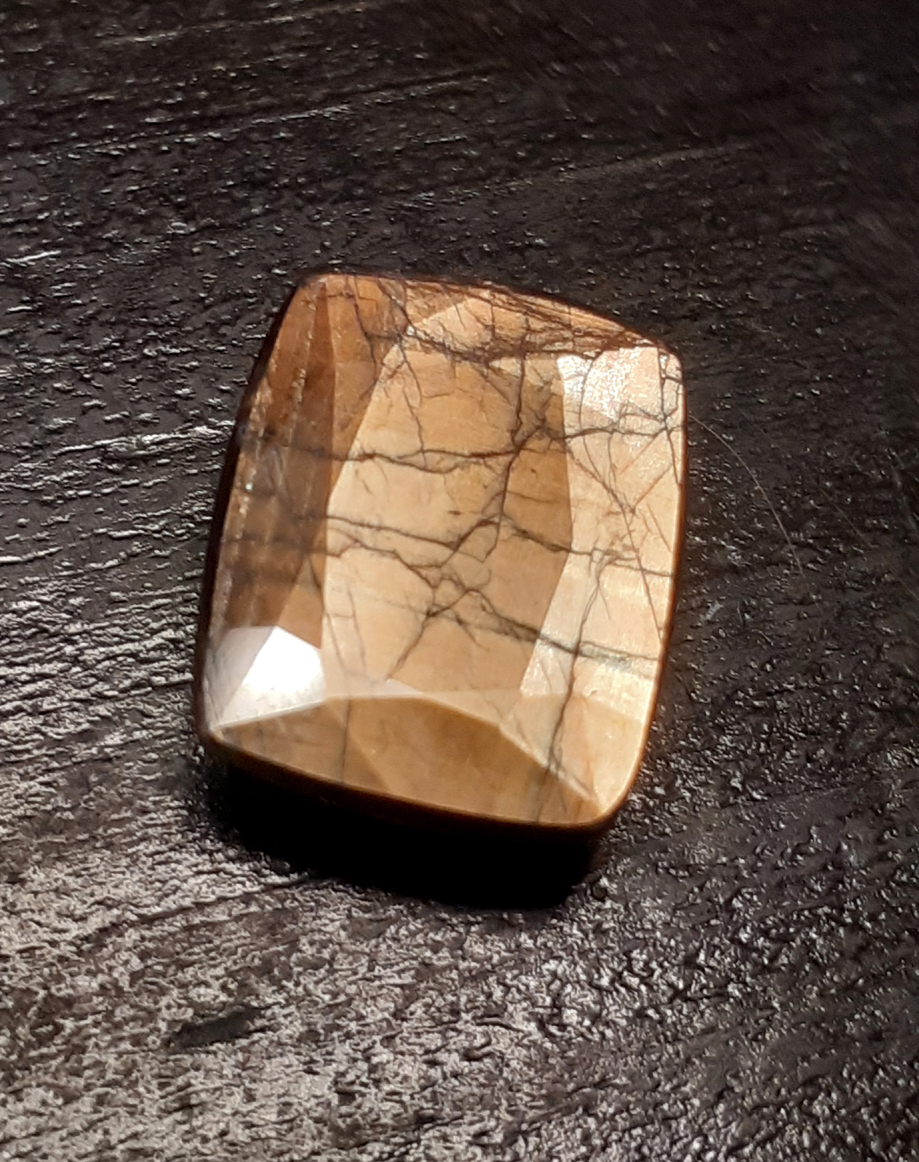

General
- Category: Oxide mineral
- Formula: Aluminium oxide, Al_{2}O_{3}
- Crystal system: Trigonal
- Crystal class: Hexagonal scalenohedral (3̅m); H-M symbol: (3̅2/m)
- Space group: R3̅c

Identification
- Color: Typically metallic gold, copper or bronze, blue, green but varies
- Crystal habit: As crystals, massive and granular
- Fracture: Conchoidal, splintery
- Mohs scale hardness: 9.0
- Luster: Vitreous
- Specific gravity: 3.95–4.03
- Optical properties: Abbe number 72.2
- Refractive index: n_{ω}=1.768–1.772 n_{ε}=1.760–1.763, Birefringence 0.008
- Pleochroism: Strong
- Melting point: 2,030–2,050 °C
- Fusibility: Infusible
- Solubility: Insoluble
- Other characteristics: Coefficient of thermal expansion (5.0–6.6)×10^{−6}/K relative permittivity at 20 °C ε = 8.9–11.1 (anisotropic).

Golden sheen sapphire, (or goldsheen sapphire) is a recently discovered variety of corundum. Goldsheen sapphire has been tested and confirmed in lab reports as "natural sapphire" by GIA, GIT, GRS, AIGS, Tokio gem labs and Lotus.

Goldsheen sapphire has a golden shine, almost like gold. Translucent blue, green or yellow material is sometimes present together with the gold. Particularly prominent is hematite which will often result in the formation of geometric hexagonal patterns within the gemstone crystal.

== Evidence ==
Several articles, including the Journal of Gemmology state that gold sheen sapphire is high in iron and titanium oxide. It has inclusions of ilmenite, hematite (gold color) and magnetite (black). It exhibits asterism and hexagonal growth, a lack of UV fluorescence, healed fractures and polysynthetic twinning (parallel lines). Golden sheen has a stronger golden shine and sometimes has blue and gold in the same stone.

== Source ==
Previously, it was claimed in the Journal of Gemmology (JoG), that the source is a depleted mine in Kenya close to the border of Somalia. TJN Colors, GIT and In Color also previously published that the origin was Kenya. However, GIA Tokyo and Gems and Jewellery stated in 2018 that the location is not known. GIA and JoG stated that golden sheen sapphires are reportedly mined in northeastern Kenya, there is no other published chemical data available from this region
