= Adeimantus =

Adeimantus may refer to:

- Adeimantus of Collytus, elder brother of Ancient Greek philosopher Plato
- Adeimantus of Corinth, Greek commander at the Battle of Salamis in 480 BC
- Adeimantus (son of Leucolophides), one of the commanders with Alcibiades in his expedition against Andros in 407 BC
