= Information Matrix for the Analysis of Journals =

Information Matrix for the Analysis of Journals (MIAR) (Spanish: Matriz de Información para el Análisis de Revistas) is a free, online database developed by the University of Barcelona. It includes information on scientific journals from all areas and indicates the dissemination of scientific journals in international repertoires, catalogs, and databases, comparing them at the national and international level. It includes the title, ISSN, country, URL, scope, academic field, where it is indexed, where it is evaluated, what metrics it appears in, OA policies, and the score given to the journal.
