= Adamant =

Mythological hardest substance

Adamant in classical mythology is an archaic form of diamond. The English word diamond is ultimately derived from adamas, via Late Latin diamas and Old French diamant. In ancient Greek ἀδάμας (adamas), genitive ἀδάμαντος (adamantos), literally 'unconquerable, untameable'. In those days, the qualities of hard metal (probably steel) were attributed to it, and adamant became an independent concept as a result.

In the Middle Ages adamant also became confused with the magnetic rock lodestone, and a folk etymology connected it with the Latin adamare, 'to love or be attached to'. Another connection was the belief that adamant (the diamond definition) could block the effects of a magnet. This was addressed in chapter III of Pseudodoxia Epidemica, for instance.

Since the contemporary word diamond is now used for the hardest gemstone, the increasingly archaic noun adamant has been reduced to mostly poetic or anachronistic use. In that capacity, the name, and various derivatives of it, are frequently used in modern media to refer to a variety of fictional substances.

== In mythology ==
- In Greek mythology, Cronus castrated his father Uranus using an adamant sickle given to him by his mother Gaia. An adamantine sickle or sword was also used by the hero Perseus to decapitate the Gorgon Medusa while she slept.
- Three Phrygian Dactyls, in the service of the Great Mother as Adraste (Ἀδράστη), are usually named Acmon (the anvil), Damnameneus (the hammer), and Celmis (casting). Of Celmis, Ovid (in Metamorphoses iv) made a story that when Rhea was offended at this childhood companion of Zeus, she asked Zeus to turn him to diamond-hard adamant, like a tempered blade. Zeus obliged.
- In the Greek tragedy Prometheus Bound (translated by G. M. Cookson), Hephaestus is to bind Prometheus "to the jagged rocks in adamantine bonds infrangible".
- In Hesiod's Works and Days, the third race of men is compared to adamant, so as to imply great strength.
- In Virgil's Aeneid, the gate of Tartarus is framed with pillars of solid adamant, "that no might of man, nay, not even the sons of heaven, could uproot in war"
- In some versions of the Alexander Romance, Alexander the Great builds walls of Adamantine, the Gates of Alexander, to keep the giants Gog and Magog from pillaging the peaceful southern lands.
- In The Hypostasis of the Archons, Gnostic scripture from the Nag Hammadi Library refers to the Adamantine Land, an incorruptible place 'above' from whence the spirit came to dwell within man so that he became Adam, he who moves upon the ground with a living soul.
- Adamant is used as a translation in the King James Bible in Ezekiel 3:9 for the word שמיר (Shamir), the original word in the Hebrew Bible.

== In popular culture ==
- In the romance of Parzival, Gahmuret wears an adamant helmet, the hardness of which is compromised with goat blood.
- In The Divine Comedy by Dante, completed 1320, the angel at purgatory's gate sits on adamant.
- In the Early Modern epic poem The Faerie Queene, published 1590, Sir Artegal's sword Chrysaor is made of adamant.
- In the Holy Sonnet I, published 1620, John Donne states in line 14, "And thou like adamant draw mine iron heart".
- In John Milton's epic poem Paradise Lost, adamant or adamantine is mentioned eight times. First in Book 1, Satan is hurled "to bottomless perdition, there to dwell in adamantine chains and penal fire" (lines 47–48). Three times in Book 2 the gates of hell are described as being made of adamantine (lines 436, 646 and 853). In Book 6, Satan "Came towring [sic], armd [sic] in Adamant and Gold" (line 110), his shield is described as "of tenfold adamant" (line 255), and the armor worn by the fallen angels is described as "adamantine" (line 542). Finally in book 10 the metaphorical "Pinns [sic] of Adamant and Chains" (lines 318–319) bind the world to Satan, and thus to sin and death.
- In Gulliver's Travels by Jonathan Swift, the base of the fictitious flying island of Laputa (Part III of Gulliver's Travels) is constructed of adamant.
- In J. R. R. Tolkien's The Lord of the Rings, Nenya, one of the Three Rings of Power, is set with a gem of adamant; the fortress of Barad-dûr is also partly built from "adamant". The crown of Gondor is described as having "seven gems of adamant".
- In the tabletop roleplaying game Dungeons & Dragons, Adamantine is an exotic metal of great strength.
- In His Dark Materials by Philip Pullman, in the third book, The Amber Spyglass (2000), Lord Asriel's tower is made of adamant.

== See also ==
- Adamant (1811 ship)
- Adamant Mountain, in Canada
- Adam Ant, musician
- adamant, a noun defined at Wiktionary
- Adamant, Vermont, a village in Washington County, Vermont, US
- Adamantane, a bulky hydrocarbon
- Adamantine spar, a real mineral
- adamantine, an adjective defined at Wiktionary
- Aggregated diamond nanorods, ultrahard, nanocrystalline form of diamond
- Unobtainium, a name given to exotic, fictional materials used in science fiction
- Adamantina, a Brazilian municipality in the state of São Paulo.
- Adamantium, a fictional metal alloy in the Marvel Universe
