= Ceylonite =

Spinel mineral

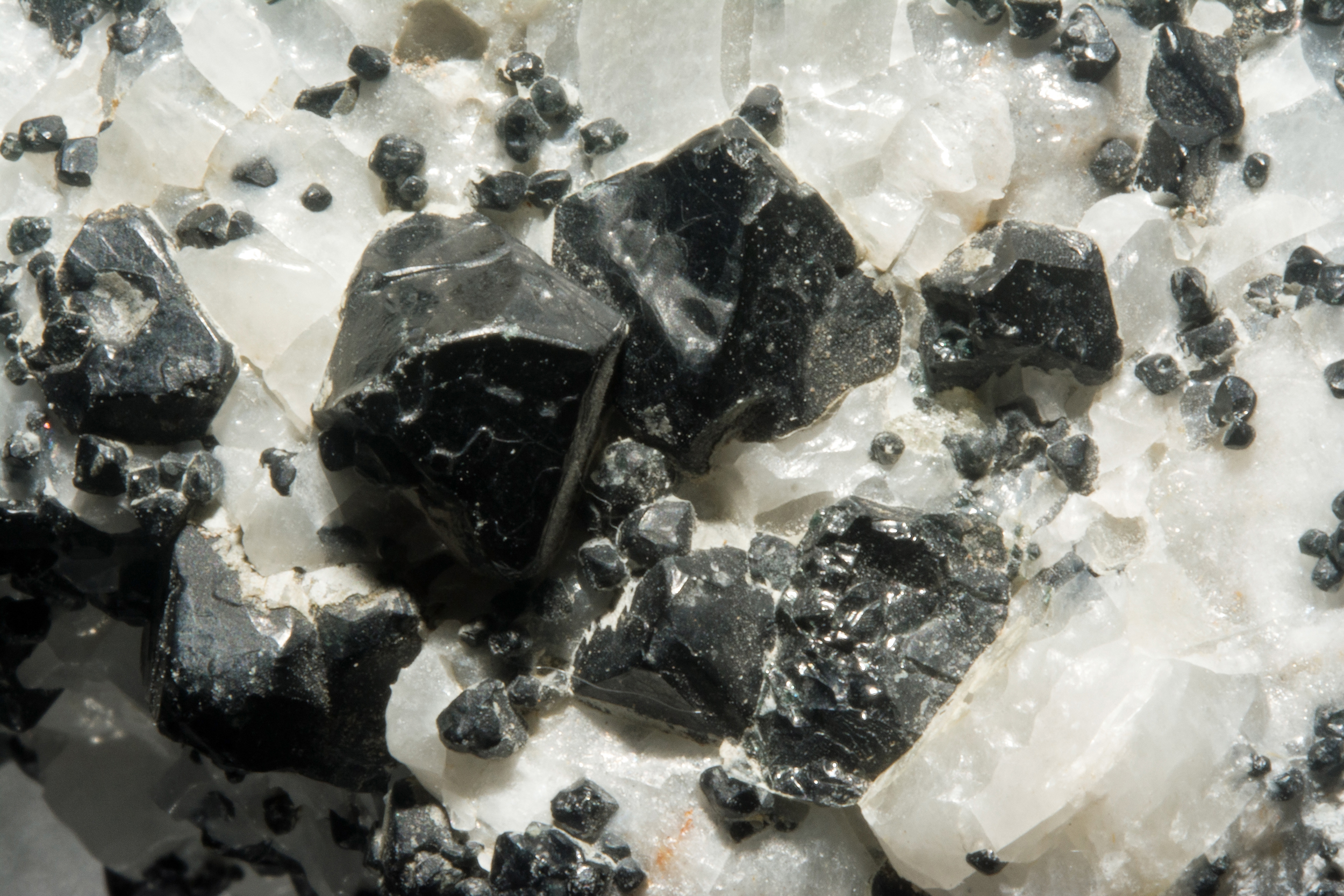

General
- Category: Oxide minerals Spinel group Spinel structural group
- Formula: (Mg,Fe)Al_{2}O_{4}
- Crystal system: Isometric

Identification
- Color: Various; red to blue to mauve, dark green, brown, black
- Crystal habit: Cubic, octahedral
- Cleavage: Indistinct
- Fracture: Conchoidal, uneven
- Mohs scale hardness: 7.5–8.0
- Luster: Vitreous
- Streak: White
- Diaphaneity: Transparent to translucent
- Specific gravity: 3.6–3.9
- Optical properties: Isotropic
- Refractive index: 1.770-1.780
- Pleochroism: Absent
- Solubility: none
- Other characteristics: Nonmagnetic, non-radioactive, sometimes fluorescent (red)

Ceylonite (first cited 1793) and pleonaste (first cited 1801) or pleonast are dingy blue or grey-to-black varieties of spinel. Ceylonite, named for the island of Ceylon, is a ferroan spinel mineral with Mg:Fe from 3:1 and 1:1, and little or no ferric iron. Pleonaste is named from the Greek for 'abundant,' for its many crystal forms, and is distinguished chemically by low Mg:Fe ratios of approximately 1:3. It is sometimes used as a gemstone.

== Composition ==
The mineral ceylonite has the chemical composition of (Mg, Fe^{2+}) Al_{2}O_{4}, putting it into a group of minerals known as the spinel group, or the oxide spinels. The oxide spinels have a formula of the model [A][B]_{2}O_{4}; where [A] is commonly Fe^{2+}, Mg^{2+}, or Mn^{2+}, and [B] is Fe^{3+}, Al^{3+}, or Cr^{3+}. It is an iron-rich variety of the spinel mineral species.

== Structure ==
Ceylonite has the structural formula [A]Al_{2}O_{4}, where [A] cation is Mg^{2+} or Fe^{2+}. This formula creates a face centered cubic Bravais lattice, with a space group of Fd3m. The point symmetry can be three possibilities; 4*3m, 3*m, or mm. Within the oxygen sub-lattice of ceylonite, the Mg^{2+} ions occupy tetrahedral 4c symmetry positions, and the Al^{3+} ions occupy octahedral 8f site. This allows for the remaining octahedral site to be open for defects, causing a variety in structure and physical properties.

Ceylonite can actually undergo a solid solution series in which the composition changes, but it is still ceylonite. Magnesium rich ceylonite can undergo an increase in iron that will replace the magnesium cation in the A-block, therefore making the new composition Fe^{2+}Al_{2}O_{4}. The chemistry changes, but the mineral technically remains ceylonite.

== Occurrence ==
The ceylonite first discovered on the island of Ceylon, modern day Sri Lanka, was found imbedded in calcareous spar, and accompanied by pyrite and micas. The crystals were located in a low lying dried up river, and were relatively shallow in the soil; 8 to 10 inches. On one side of the bank a mass of gneiss was exposed, on the other, a graphic granite vein.

The grains in the first discovered ceylonite looked of compacted soils, leading one to believe they were perhaps sedimentary in formation. This was an early hypothesis, and did not hold true after further analysis.

The Mg-ceylonite has a much more reliable study of its geological occurrence. It is found in Mg and Al rich igneous rocks, as well as, metamorphic rock. Like many rocks and mineral, ceylonite is weathered and can be found in sedimentary rocks.

== History ==
Ceylonite and pleonaste are historical terms in mineralogy. Nevertheless, both terms are used in the current mineralogical literature.
