= Adamantine spar =

Variety of corundum

General
- Category: Minerals
- Formula: Al_{2}O_{3}

Identification
- Color: Brown
- Mohs scale hardness: 9
- Luster: Silky

Adamantine spar is a silky brown variety of corundum. It has a hardness of 9 on the Mohs scale.

== See also ==
- Yogo sapphire
