= Adamant (1811 ship) =

History

United Kingdom
- Name: Adamant
- Owner: 1811:Wm. Clark; 1813:Woodstock (or Woodcock); 1820:Captain smith; 1821:Foster (or Forster)
- Builder: Blyth
- Launched: 28 September 1811
- Fate: Wrecked 1828

General characteristics
- Tons burthen: 42788/94 or 428, or 429 (bm)
- Propulsion: Sail
- Armament: 1812:2 × 6-pounder guns + 8 × 18-pounder carronades; 1815:10 × 18-pounder carronades

Adamant was launched in 1811 at Blythe. She was a general trader that sailed to such places as Sierra Leone, Riga, New York, Quebec, and Australia. In 1821 she transported convicts to Sydney, New South Wales. She wrecked in 1828 on a voyage from Quebec back to London.

== Career ==
Adamant enters Lloyd's Register in 1811 with W. Wright, master, and Wm. Clark, owner. The 1812 volume of Lloyd's Register gave her master as Miller, and her trade as London transport.

Year	Master	Owner	Trade	Source
1813	R. Miller	Woodstock	London transport	Lloyd's Register (1813)
1814	R. Miller	Woodstock	London transport	Lloyd's Register (1814)
1815	Miller; Christie	Woodcock	London transport	Lloyd's Register (1815)
1816	R. Miller; Hutchinson	Woodstock	London transport	Lloyd's Register (1816)
1818	Hutchinson	Woodstock	London—Saint Helena	Lloyd's Register (1818)
1819	Hutchinson; Smith	Woodstock	London—Saint Helena; London—Jamaica	Lloyd's Register (1819)
1820	Smith	Captain & Co.	London—Jamaica	Lloyd's Register (1820)
1821	Smith; Ebsworthy	Captain & Co. Foster	London—Jamaica; London—New South Wales	Lloyd's Register (1820)

Adamant departed England on 29 March 1821 under the command of William Ebsworthy and with surgeon James Hamilton, and arrived at Port Jackson on 8 September. The guard consisted of detachments of the 34th and 48th regiments under orders of Lieutenant Thompson of the 34th. She embarked 144 male convicts, of whom two died on the voyage.

Captain Ebsworthy, Chief Officer Mr. Easterby, Second Officer William Collins, Third Officer John Mossman, and Dr. Hamilton were all intending to depart on Adamant for Batavia on 25 September. Their voyage was delayed however by a court case involving Captain Ebsworthy and the steward of the Adamant, George Farris, who accused Ebsworthy of embezzling government stores and converting them to his private purposes. There were counter accusations and lengthy depositions taken from Farris, Dr. Hamilton, John Mossman and Sergeant James Barclay of the 48th regiment. When the enquiry was finished the results were submitted to the Governor for consideration. Adamant did not depart Sydney until about 22 October.

On 14 May 1822, Adamant, bound for London, was in dock at Bengal. She was expected to depart in June.

Year	Master	Owner	Trade	Source
1824	Ferrier	Foster	London—Jamaica	Lloyd's Register (1824)
1825	Ferrier	Foster	London—Riga	Lloyd's Register (1825)
1826	J.Rutland; G.Blackthorn	Foster	Cork—Trinidad; London—Quebec	Lloyd's Register (1826)
1827	T. Rothwell	Forster	Bristol—Sierra Leone	Lloyd's Register (1827)
1828	T. Rothwell	Forster	London	Lloyd's Register (1828)
1829	T.Rothwell	Forster	London	Lloyd's Register (1829)
1829	Brown	Foster	London—New York	Register of Shipping (1829)

== Loss ==
Late in 1828 Adamant, Brown, master, was lost at the Bird Islands, off Cape Breton, Nova Scotia. A later report has Adamant, Brown, master, sold at "Gluce" Bay (probably Glace Bay. A more detailed account reports that her crew abandoned Adamant as she was sailing from Quebec to London. Endeavour, of Hull, fell in with her on 15 November and drove her onshore near Gluce Bay. She was then sold, together with all her cargo, for £70 under the authority of the Collector of Excise.
