= Hercynite =

Spinel mineral

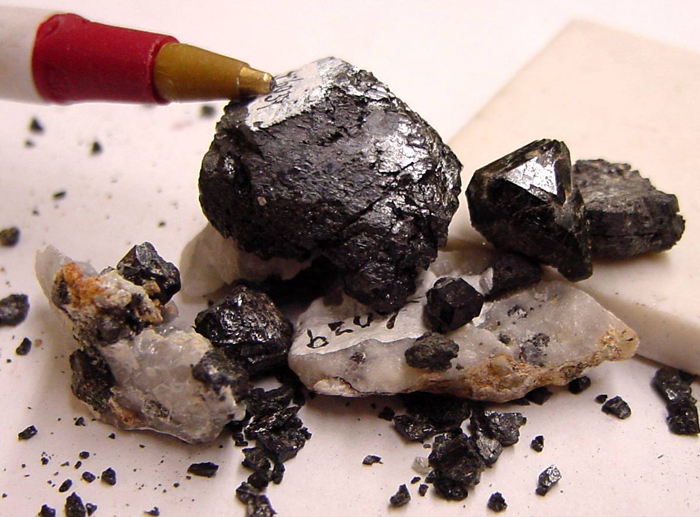

General
- Category: Oxide minerals Spinel group Spinel structural group
- Formula: Fe^{2+}Al_{2}O_{4}
- IMA symbol: Hc
- Strunz classification: 4.BB.05
- Crystal system: Isometric
- Crystal class: Hexoctahedral (m3̅m); H-M symbol: (4/m 3̅ 2/m)
- Space group: Fd3̅m (no. 227)

Identification
- Formula mass: 173.81 g/mol
- Color: Black
- Crystal habit: Euhedral crystals. Also massive to granular
- Cleavage: [111] indistinct
- Fracture: Uneven – flat surfaces (not cleavage) fractured in an uneven pattern.
- Mohs scale hardness: 7.5
- Luster: Vitreous (glassy)
- Streak: dark green
- Specific gravity: 3.95
- Optical properties: Isotropic
- Refractive index: n = 1.8
- Other characteristics: non-radioactive

Hercynite is a spinel mineral with the formula FeAl_{2}O_{4}.

It occurs in high-grade metamorphosed iron-rich argillaceous (clay-containing) sediments as well as in mafic and ultramafic igneous rocks. Due to its hardness it also is found in placers.

It was first described in 1847 and its name originates from the Latin name for the Harz, Silva Hercynia, where the species was first found.

Hercynite is a spinel of regular symmetry and normal cation distribution, but some disorder occurs in its structure. It consists of ferrous (Fe^{2+}) ions and aluminium ions (Al^{3+}); however some ferric ions (Fe^{3+}) may be located in the structure of hercynite.

Melting point of this mineral is between 1,692–1,767 °C (3,078–3,213 °F).
