= HMS Adamant =

Three ships of the Royal Navy have been named HMS Adamant:

- HMS Adamant (1780) was a 50-gun fourth rate launched in 1780. She was reduced to harbour service in 1809 and was broken up in 1814.
- HMS Adamant (1911) was a submarine depot ship launched in 1911, commissioned in 1912 and sold in 1932.
- HMS Adamant (A164) was a submarine depot ship launched in 1940 and broken up in 1970.

== See also ==
- The Acacia-class sloop HMS Lily was renamed HMS Adamant II in 1930, and was sold later that year.
- RMAS Adamant is a small submarine tender and personnel ferry in the Royal Maritime Auxiliary Service. She was launched in 1992 and is currently in service.
