= Spinel =

Mineral or gemstone

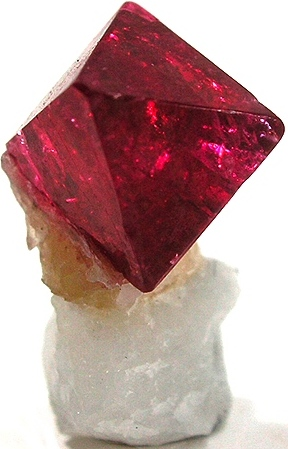
- Small spinel crystal on top of a white calcite from Mogok, Myanmar, measuring 1.5 × 1.1 × 1 cm in size

General
- Category: Oxide minerals; Spinel group; Spinel structural group
- Formula: MgAl_{2}O_{4}
- IMA symbol: Spl
- Strunz classification: 4.BB.05
- Crystal system: Cubic
- Crystal class: Hextetrahedral (4̅3m); H–M symbol: (4̅3m)
- Space group: F 4̅ 3 m (No. 216)
- Unit cell: a = 8.0898(9) Å; Z = 8

Identification
- Color: Various: red, pink, blue, lavender / violet, dark green, brown, black, clear
- Crystal habit: Octahedral or flat triangular plates caused by twinning
- Twinning: common
- Cleavage: None
- Fracture: Conchoidal
- Mohs scale hardness: 7.5–8.0
- Luster: Vitreous
- Streak: White
- Diaphaneity: Transparent to opaque
- Specific gravity: (Depending on the composition) The rare Zn-rich spinel can be as high as 4.40, otherwise it averages from 3.58 to 3.61.
- Optical properties: Isotropic
- Refractive index: 1.719
- Pleochroism: Absent
- Solubility: None
- Other characteristics: Weakly to medium magnetic; sometimes fluorescent (natural: sometimes red; synthetic: red)

Spinel (/spɪˈnɛl, ˈspɪnəl/) is the magnesium/aluminium member of the larger spinel group of minerals. It has the formula MgAl_{2}O_{4} in the cubic crystal system. The name comes from the Latin word spinella, a diminutive form of spine, in reference to its pointed crystals.

== Properties ==
Spinel crystallizes in the isometric system; common crystal forms are octahedra, usually twinned. It has no true cleavage, but shows an octahedral parting and a conchoidal fracture. Its hardness is 8, its specific gravity is 3.5–4.1, and it is transparent to opaque with a vitreous to dull luster. It may be colorless, but usually comes in shades of red, lavender, blue, green, brown, black, or yellow. Chromium(III) causes the red color in spinel from Myanmar.

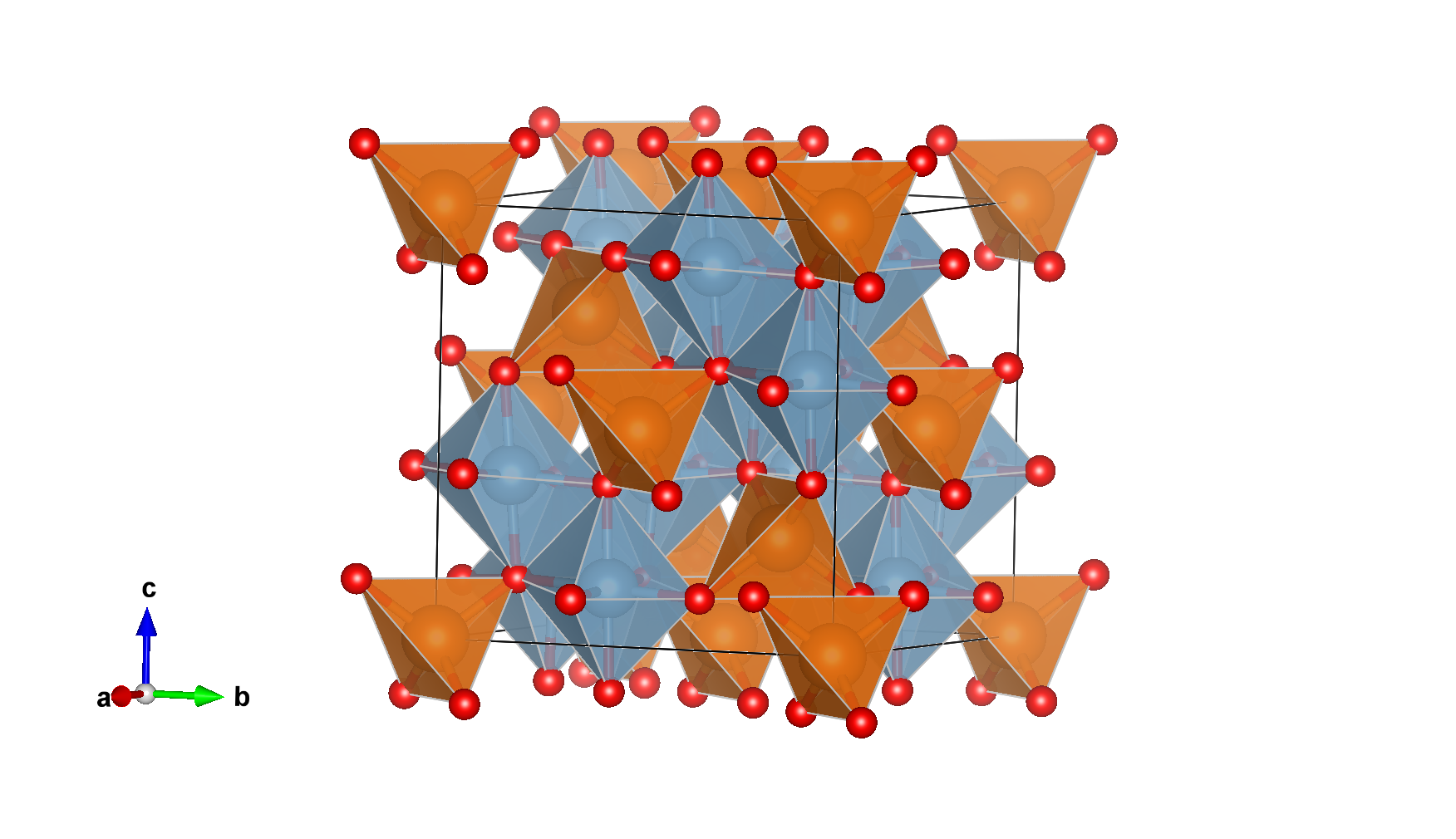
Polyhedral representation of spinel MgAl_{2}O_{4}

== History ==
Some spinels are among the most famous gemstones; these include the Black Prince's Ruby and the Timur Ruby in the British Crown Jewels, and the "Côte de Bretagne", formerly from the French Crown jewels. The Samarian Spinel, the largest known spinel in the world, weighs 500 carats (100 g).

== Nomenclature ==
The transparent red spinels were called spinel-rubies or balas rubies. Before the development of modern science and the establishment of a formal definition of "ruby", the name was also applied to spinels. "Balas" derives from Balascia, the ancient name for Badakhshan, a region in central Asia situated in the upper valley of the Panj River, one of the principal tributaries of the Oxus River. However, "Balascia" itself may be derived from Sanskrit bālasūryaka, which translates as "crimson-coloured morning sun". Mines in the Gorno Badakhshan region of present-day Tajikistan constituted for centuries the main source for red and pink spinels.

== Occurrence ==
=== Geologic occurrence ===
Spinel is found as a metamorphic mineral in metamorphosed limestones and silica-poor mudstones. It also occurs as a primary mineral in rare mafic igneous rocks; in these igneous rocks, the magmas are relatively deficient in alkalis relative to aluminium, and aluminium oxide may form as the mineral corundum or may combine with magnesia to form spinel. This is why spinel and ruby are often found together. The spinel petrogenesis in mafic magmatic rocks is strongly debated, but certainly results from mafic magma interaction with more evolved magma or rock (e.g. gabbro, troctolite).

Spinel, (Mg,Fe)(Al,Cr)_{2}O_{4}, is common in peridotite in the uppermost Earth's mantle, between approximately 20 km to approximately 120 km, possibly to lower depths depending on the chromium content. At significantly shallower depths, above the Moho, calcic plagioclase is the more stable aluminous mineral in peridotite while garnet is the stable phase deeper in the mantle below the spinel stability region.

Spinel, (Mg,Fe)Al_{2}O_{4}, is a common mineral in the Ca-Al-rich inclusions (CAIs) in some chondritic meteorites.

=== Geographical occurrence ===
Spinel has long been found in the gemstone-bearing gravel of Sri Lanka and in limestones of the Badakshan Province in modern-day Afghanistan and Tajikistan; and of Mogok in Myanmar. Over the last decades gem quality spinels are found in the marbles of Lục Yên District (Vietnam), Mahenge and Matombo (Tanzania), Tsavo (Kenya) and in the gravels of Tunduru (Tanzania) and Ilakaka (Madagascar).

Since 2000, in several locations around the world, spinels have been discovered with unusual vivid pink or blue colors. Such "glowing" spinels are known from Mogok (Myanmar), Mahenge plateau (Tanzania), Lục Yên District (Vietnam) and some more localities. In 2018 bright blue spinels have been reported also in the southern part of Baffin Island (Canada). The pure blue coloration of spinel is caused by small additions of cobalt.

== Synthetic spinel ==
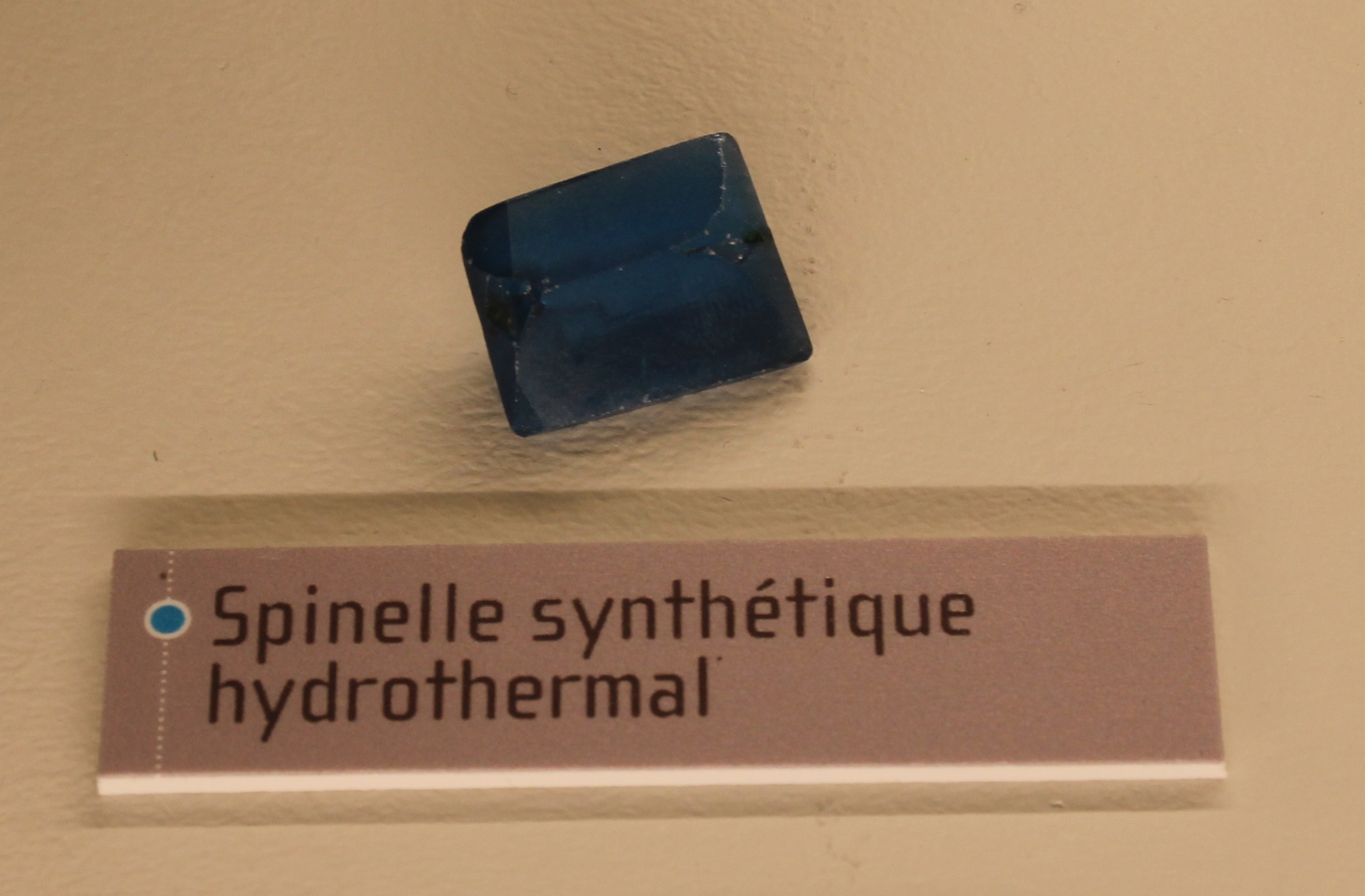
Synthetic spinel made using the hydrothermal method

Synthetic spinel can be produced by similar means to synthetic corundum, including the Verneuil method and the flux method pioneered by Edmond Frémy. It is widely used as an inexpensive cut gem in birthstone jewelry for the month of August. Light blue synthetic spinel is a good imitation of aquamarine beryl, and green synthetic spinel is used as an emerald or tourmaline simulant. By 2015, transparent spinel was being made in sheets and other shapes through sintering. Synthetic spinel, which looks like glass but has notably higher strength against pressure, can also have applications in military and commercial use.

Spinel-type chalcogenides are also investigated as optoelectronic semiconductors. In 2025, Hanzawa et al. reported d^{0}-cation spinel sulfides based on ZnSc_{2}S_{4} and (Zn,Mg)Sc_{2}S_{4} with color-tunable direct band gaps and ambipolar dopability.

== See also ==
- Aluminium oxynitride
- Ceylonite
- The Three Brothers, a lost 14th-century crown jewel with three red spinels in a triangular arrangement

== Bibliography ==
- Deer, Howie and Zussman (1966). An Introduction to the Rock-Forming Minerals, Longman, pp. 424–433, ISBN 0-582-44210-9.
- Shumann, Walter (2006). Gemstones of the World 3rd edition, Sterling, pp. 116–117.
