= Leucophoenicite =

Mineral

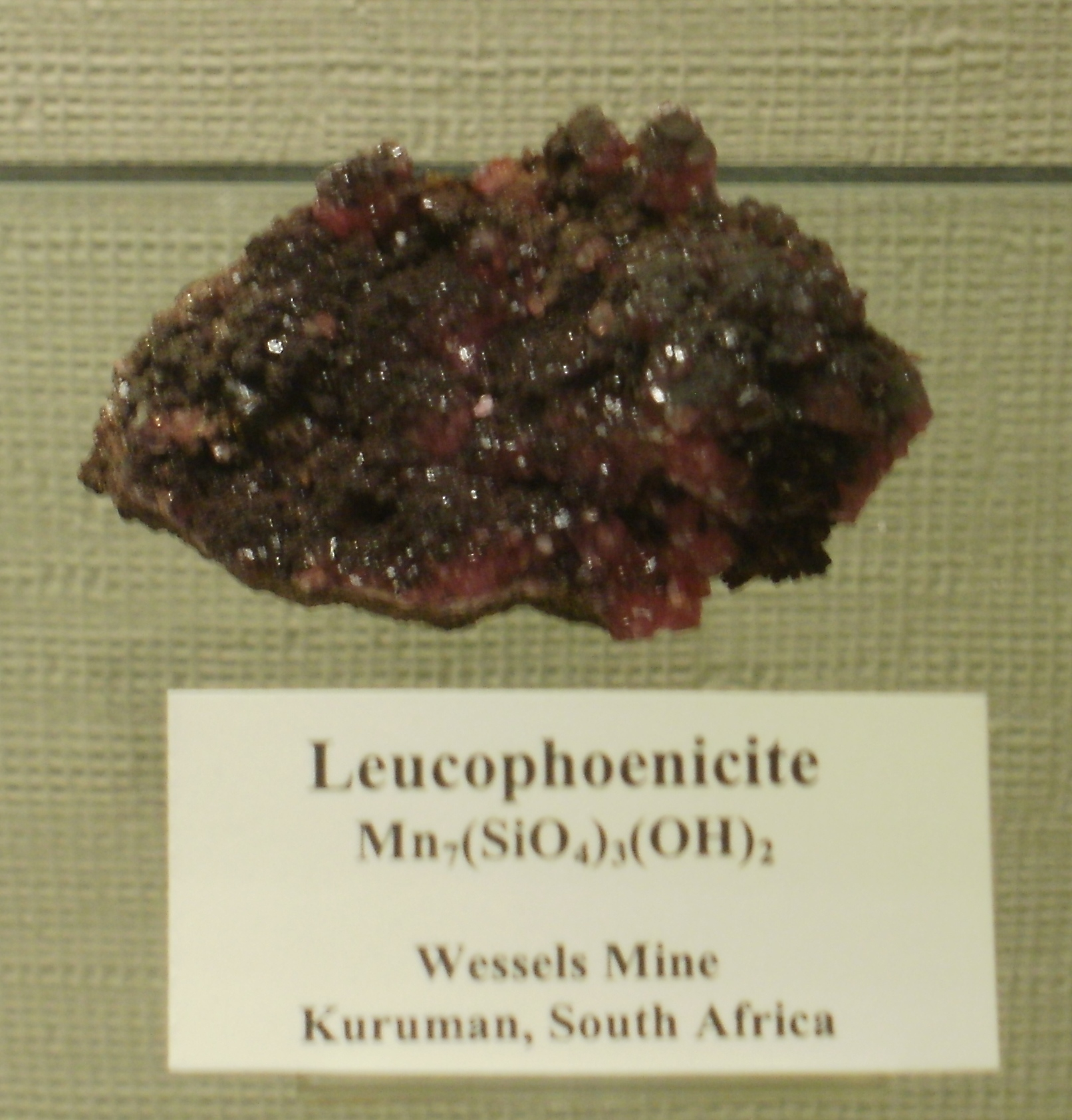
- Leucophoenicite from the Wessels Mine in Kuruman, South Africa.

General
- Category: Nesosilicates
- Formula: Mn_{7}(SiO_{4})_{3}(OH)_{2}
- IMA symbol: Lpo
- Strunz classification: 9.AF.60
- Dana classification: 52.3.2c.2
- Crystal system: Monoclinic
- Crystal class: Prismatic (2/m) (same H-M symbol)
- Space group: P2_{1}/a
- Unit cell: a = 10.84 Å b = 4.82 Å c = 11.32 Å β = 103.93°; Z = 2

Identification
- Cleavage: Imperfect on {001}
- Tenacity: Brittle
- Mohs scale hardness: 5.5 to 6
- Luster: Vitreous
- Diaphaneity: Transparent to translucent
- Optical properties: Biaxial (−)
- Refractive index: n_{α} = 1.751 n_{β} = 1.771 n_{γ} = 1.782
- Birefringence: δ = 0.031
- Pleochroism: Faint; rose-red ∥ {001} Colorless ⊥ {001}
- 2V angle: 74° (measured)
- Ultraviolet fluorescence: Non-fluorescent

Leucophoenicite is a mineral with formula Mn_{7}(SiO_{4})_{3}(OH)_{2}. Generally brown to red or pink in color, the mineral gets its name from the Greek words meaning "pale purple-red". Leucophoenicite was discovered in New Jersey, US and identified as a new mineral in 1899.

== Description ==
Leucophoenicite is normally brown, light purple-red, raspberry-red or pink in color; in thin section it is rose-red to colorless. The name is derived from the Greek words leukos, meaning "pale", and foinis, meaning "purple-red", in reference to its common coloring.

Leucophoenicite typically occurs as isolated grains or it has granular massive habit. Crystals of the mineral, which occur rarely, are slender, prismatic, elongated, and striated. The mineral forms in a low pressure, hydrothermal environment or in a contact zone in the veins and skarns of a stratiform Zn-Mn ore body.

Leucophoenicite is a member of the humite group. It has been found in association with barite, barysilite, calcite, copper, franklinite, garnet, glaucochroite, hausmannite, jerrygibbsite, manganosite, pyrochroite, rhodochrosite, sonolite, spessartine, sussexite, tephroite, vesuvianite, willemite, and zincite.

== History ==
Leucophoenicite was first found by J. J. McGovern at the Franklin Mine in New Jersey. The specimen, which consisted mostly of the mineral, was given to C. H. Warren in 1897. First thought to be clinohedrite deeply colored by manganese, it was identified as a new mineral in 1899 by Warren and Samuel Lewis Penfield. The mineral was also discovered around this time from the Buckwheat Pit in New Jersey; however, it was not identified as leucophoenicite until 1906 as it had been overlooked or mistaken for some other substance.

The crystallography was first described by Charles Palache in 1910, as Penfield and Warren had been unable to determine even the crystal system of leucophoenicite. Material thought to be leucophoenicite, studied in 1928, 1935, and 1967, was in fact a composite of leucophoenicite, sonolite, and alleghanyite. The specimens studied by Warren and Penfield in 1899 and Palache in 1910 were both true leucophoenicite.

== Distribution ==
As of 2012, leucophoenicite has been found in Italy, Japan, Namibia, Romania, South Africa, Sweden, and the US. The type material is held in the United States at Yale University and Harvard University.
