= Sonolite =

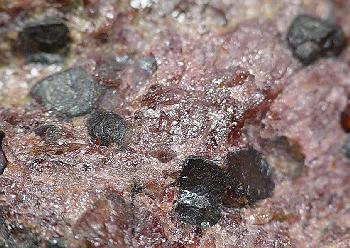
- Sonolite (in bottom left corner) with zincite and manganosite

General
- Category: Silicate minerals
- Formula: Mn_{9}(SiO_{4})_{4}(OH,F)_{2}
- IMA symbol: Snl
- Strunz classification: 9.AF.55
- Dana classification: 52.3.2d.3
- Crystal system: Monoclinic
- Crystal class: Prismatic (2/m) (same H-M symbol)
- Space group: P2_{1}/b
- Unit cell: a = 4.87 Å, b = 10.66 Å c = 14.28 Å β = 100.3°, Z = 2

Identification
- Color: Red-orange, pinkish brown to dark brown Colorless in thin section
- Twinning: Common, singular or lamellar on {101}
- Mohs scale hardness: 5.5
- Luster: Vitreous, dull
- Diaphaneity: Transparent to translucent
- Density: 3.82–4.00 (measured)
- Optical properties: Biaxial (−)
- Refractive index: n_{α} = 1.765 n_{β} = 1.778 n_{γ} = 1.787
- Birefringence: δ = 0.022
- 2V angle: 75° to 82° (measured)
- Dispersion: r > v

Sonolite is a mineral with formula Mn_{9}(SiO_{4})_{4}(OH,F)_{2}. The mineral was discovered in 1960 in the Sono mine in Kyoto Prefecture, Japan. In 1963, it was identified as a new mineral and named after the Sono mine.

== Description ==
Sonolite is transparent to translucent and is red-orange, pinkish brown to dark brown in color and colorless in thin sections. The mineral has a granular habit or occurs as prismatic to anhedral crystals up to 2.5 cm (0.98 in). Sonolite is the manganese analogue of clinohumite, a dimorph of jerrygibbsite, and a member of the humite group.

The mineral occurs in metamorphosed manganese-rich deposits. Sonolite has been found in association with calcite, chlorite, franklinite, galaxite, manganosite, pyrochroite, rhodochrosite, tephroite, willemite, and zincite.

== History ==
In 1960, Mayumi Yoshinaga was investigating alleghanyite and other manganese orthosilicates in Japan. He discovered a dull, red-brown mineral on the first level ore body of the Sono Mine, and later from a number of other sites. Using samples from ten locations in Japan and one in Taiwan, the mineral was described in 1963 and identified as a new mineral species. It was named sonolite after the mine in which it was first found and the name was approved by the International Mineralogical Association.

== Distribution ==
As of 2012, sonolite has been found in Austria, France, Japan, Kyrgyzstan, Romania, Russia, Sweden, Switzerland, Taiwan, and the United States. The type material is held at Harvard University in Cambridge, Massachusetts, US.
