= Norbergite =

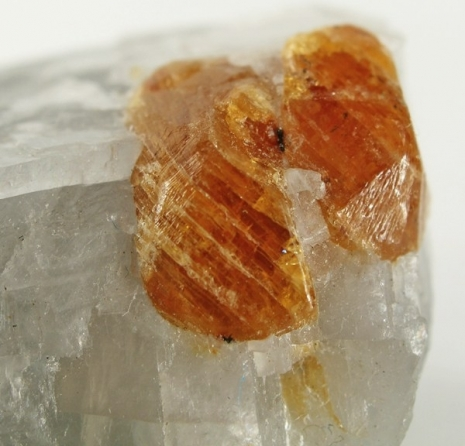
- Norbergite crystals on calcite from Oakssaung Hill, Mogok, Mandalay, Burma (size: 4.2 x 3.3 x 2.3 cm)

General
- Category: Nesosilicates
- Formula: Mg_{3}(SiO_{4})(F,OH)_{2}
- IMA symbol: Nrb
- Strunz classification: 9.AF.40
- Crystal system: Orthorhombic
- Crystal class: Dipyramidal (mmm); H-M symbol: (2/m 2/m 2/m)
- Space group: Pnma
- Unit cell: a = 8.747(6), b = 4.710(4) c = 10.271(8) [Å]; Z = 4

Identification
- Formula mass: 202.00 g/mol
- Color: Tan, yellow, yellow-orange, orange-brown, pink with purplish tint, white
- Crystal habit: Granular, tabular crystals rare
- Fracture: Uneven to subconchoidal
- Tenacity: Brittle
- Mohs scale hardness: 6–6.5
- Luster: Vitreous to resinous
- Streak: White
- Diaphaneity: Transparent to translucent
- Specific gravity: 3.177
- Optical properties: Biaxial (+)
- Refractive index: n_{α} = 1.563 n_{β} = 1.567 n_{γ} = 1.590
- Birefringence: δ = 0.027
- Pleochroism: Pleochroism: X = pale yellow; Y = very pale yellow; Z = colorless
- 2V angle: 44 – 50°
- Other characteristics: May fluoresce canary-yellow under SW UV

Norbergite is a nesosilicate mineral with formula Mg_{3}(SiO_{4})(F,OH)_{2}. It is a member of the humite group.

It was first described in 1926 for an occurrence in the Östanmoss iron mine in Norberg, Västmanland, Sweden, for which it is named. It occurs in contact metamorphic zones in carbonate rocks intruded by plutonic rocks or pegmatites supplying the fluorine. Associated minerals include dolomite, calcite, tremolite, grossular, wollastonite, forsterite, monticellite, cuspidine, fluoborite, ludwigite, fluorite and phlogopite.
