= Tephroite =

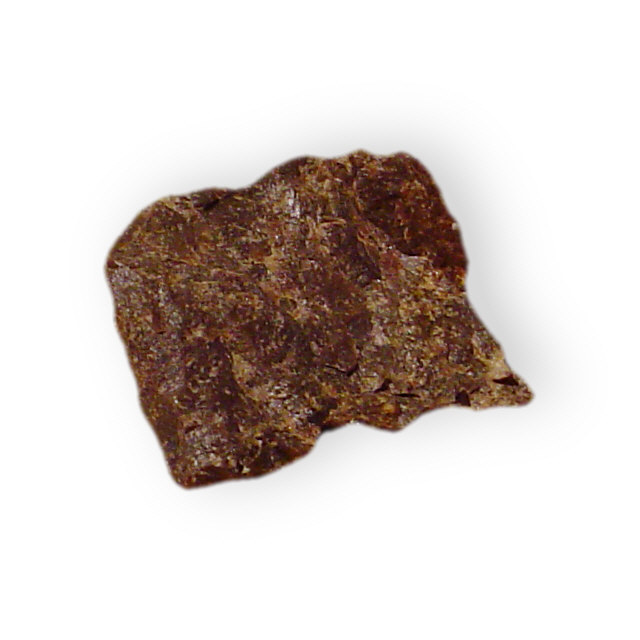
- Tephroite from Japan

General
- Category: Silicate mineral
- Formula: Mn_{2}SiO_{4}
- IMA symbol: Tep
- Crystal system: Orthorhombic
- Crystal class: Dipyramidal (mmm); H-M symbol: (2/m 2/m 2/m)
- Space group: Pnma (no. 62)
- Unit cell: a = 4.88(2) Å, b = 10.61(2) Å c = 6.24(2) Å; Z = 4

Identification
- Color: Olive-green, bluish green, gray, °esh-red, reddish brown; pale green in thin section, may be colorless
- Crystal habit: Crystals typically short, prismatic, to 4 cm, or anhedral, equidimensional. Commonly in disseminated grains, compact, or massive.
- Twinning: Uncommon on {011}
- Cleavage: {010}, distinct; {001}, imperfect
- Fracture: Uneven to conchoidal
- Tenacity: Brittle
- Mohs scale hardness: 6
- Luster: Vitreous to greasy
- Streak: Pale gray
- Diaphaneity: Transparent to translucent
- Specific gravity: 3.87 – 4.12
- Optical properties: Biaxial (−)
- Refractive index: n_{α} = 1.759 n_{β} = 1.797 n_{γ} = 1.860
- Birefringence: δ = 0.101
- Pleochroism: Weak; X = brownish red; Y = reddish; Z = greenish blue.
- 2V angle: Measured: 60° to 70°, Calculated: 78°

Tephroite is the manganese endmember of the olivine group of nesosilicate minerals with the formula Mn_{2}SiO_{4}. A solid solution series exists between tephroite and its analogues, the group endmembers fayalite and forsterite. Divalent iron or magnesium may readily replace manganese in the olivine crystal structure.

It was first described for an occurrence at the Sterling Hill Mine and Franklin, New Jersey, United States. It occurs in iron-manganese ore deposits and their related skarns. It also occurs in metamorphosed manganese-rich sediments. It occurs in association with: zincite, willemite, franklinite, rhodonite, jacobsite, diopside, gageite, bustamite, manganocalcite, glaucochroite, calcite, banalsite and alleghanyite. It can also be found in England and Sweden.

Tephroite has a hardness of 6 and a specific gravity of approximately 4.1, which is heavy for non-metallic minerals. Its name comes from the Greek tephros, "ash gray", for its color. It can also be found olive-green, greenish-blue, pink, or brown. Other names for tephroite include mangan olivine and mangan peridot.
