= Clinohumite =

Nesosilicate mineral

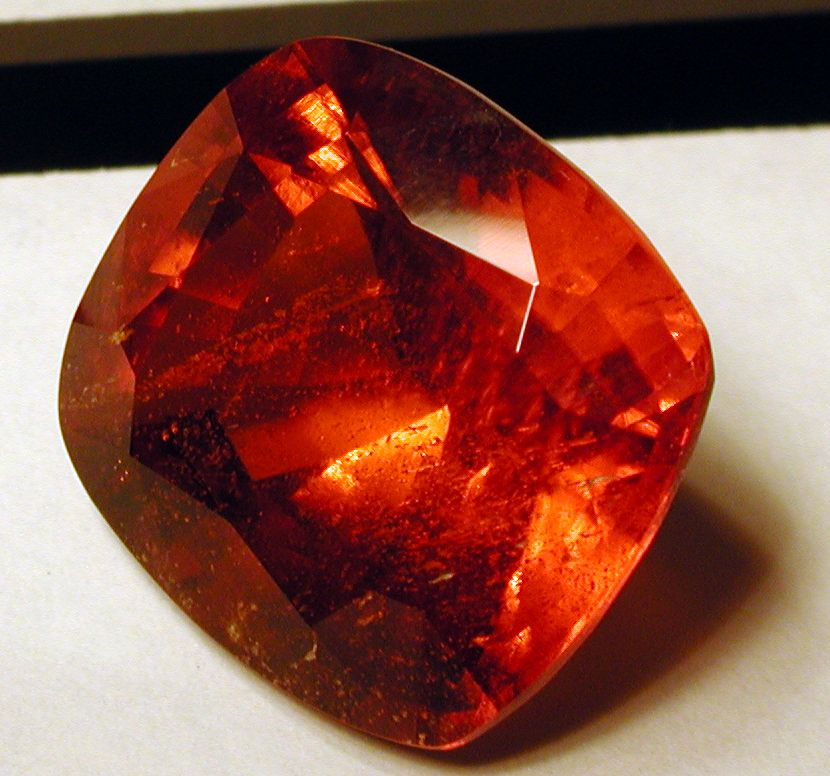

General
- Category: Nesosilicate
- Formula: (Mg,Fe)_{9}(SiO_{4})_{4}(F,OH)_{2}
- IMA symbol: Chu
- Crystal system: Monoclinic
- Crystal class: Prismatic (2/m) (same H-M symbol)
- Space group: P2_{1}/c
- Unit cell: a = 13.71 Å, b = 4.75 Å, c = 10.29 Å; β = 100.83°; Z = 2

Identification
- Color: Brownish to orange, yellow, red
- Crystal habit: Granular, prismatic, twinned
- Twinning: Simple, lamellar common on {100}
- Cleavage: Poor on {100}
- Fracture: Subconchoidal to uneven
- Mohs scale hardness: 6
- Luster: Vitreous to resinous
- Streak: White
- Diaphaneity: Transparent to translucent
- Specific gravity: 3.17–3.35
- Optical properties: biaxial (+)
- Refractive index: n_{α} = 1.623 – 1.702 n_{β} = 1.636 – 1.709 n_{γ} = 1.651 – 1.728
- Birefringence: +0.028
- Pleochroism: X = golden yellow, yellow-brown, deep reddish yellow; Y = pale yellow, yellow-orange, light yellow; Z = pale yellow, yellow-orange, colorless
- 2V angle: Measured: 52° to 90°

Major varieties
- Titanclinohumite: Titanoan; (Mg,Fe^{2+},Ti)_{9} [(F,OH,O)_{2}|(SiO_{4})_{4}]

Clinohumite is an uncommon member of the humite group, a magnesium silicate according to the chemical formula (Mg, Fe)_{9}(SiO_{4})_{4}(F,OH)_{2}. The formula can be thought of as four olivine (Mg_{2}SiO_{4}), plus one brucite (Mg(OH)_{2}). Indeed, the mineral is essentially a hydrated olivine and occurs in altered ultramafic rocks and carbonatites. Most commonly found as tiny indistinct grains, large euhedral clinohumite crystals are sought by collectors and occasionally fashioned into bright, yellow-orange gemstones. Only two sources of gem-quality material are known: the Pamir Mountains of Tajikistan, and the Taymyr region of northern Siberia. It is one of two humite group minerals that have been cut into gems, the other being the much more common chondrodite.

== Properties ==
A monoclinic mineral, clinohumite is typically a dark to light brownish or orangy yellow, somewhat resembling the hessonite variety of grossular. Clinohumite's crystal habit is usually granular, but may also be prismatic; crystals are almost always small. Simple and multiple crystal twinning (on {001}) is common, resulting in a highly variable habit. Clinohumite is brittle with a hardness of 6 and a poor basal cleavage. Its specific gravity is 3.2–3.4, and its fracture is conchoidal to uneven; its streak is white.

Clinohumite's transparency ranges from transparent to translucent; its luster ranges from a dull vitreous to resinous. Its refractive index (as measured via sodium light, 589.3 nm) is as follows: α 1.631; β 1.638–1.647; γ 1.668;, with a maximum birefringence of 0.028 (biaxial positive). Under shortwave ultraviolet light, some clinohumite may fluoresce an orangy yellow; there is little to no response under longwave UV.

The Taymyr material is reported to be a dark reddish brown while the Pamir material is a bright yellow to orange or brownish orange. The Pamir material also has a hardness slightly greater than 6, a lower specific gravity (3.18), and higher maximum birefringence (0.036). Phillip Youngman, master faceter of Los Osos, California, noticed not only that Pamir material is harder than expected, but also that it is less brittle than expected. Youngman observed that clinohumite reacted like beryl to cutting and polishing, and that it reminded him of polishing diopside.

Like other members of the humite group, the relative amounts of hydroxyl and fluorine vary in clinohumite, and iron commonly substitutes for some of the magnesium, bringing about changes in physical and optical properties. Titanium substitution also causes pronounced changes in optical properties, producing the variety titanclinohumite. Consequently, it is relatively easy to determine that a stone is a humite group mineral, but difficult to determine exactly which member. Other common impurities of clinohumite include aluminium, manganese, and calcium.

== Formation and occurrence ==
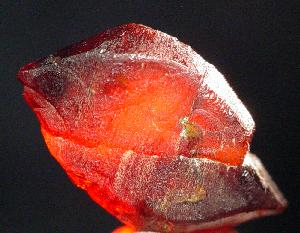
Two intergrown crystals (1.5 x 1 x 0.5 cm) from Koksha Valley, Badakhshan Province, Afghanistan

Clinohumite is a product of contact metamorphism and is commonly found as indistinct grains embedded in limestone. Its type occurrence is within the limestone ejecta of the Mount Vesuvius volcano complex near Naples, Italy, where clinohumite was discovered in 1876. The aforementioned gem-quality occurrences of Pamir and Taymyr were discovered only recently: the former in the early 1980s, and the latter in 2000. These deposits are scarce and only sporadically mined, so clinohumite remains one of the rarest gemstones with only a few thousand carats known to exist in private collections.

Other (non-gem quality) occurrences of clinohumite include: the Sør Rondane and Balchen Mountains of Antarctica; Mount Bischoff, Waratah, Tasmania; the Saualpe Mountains of Carinthia, the Koralpe mountains of Styria, and the Vals, Virgen, and Ziller valleys of the Tyrol, Austria; the Jacupiranga mine of Cajati, São Paulo State, Southeast Region, Brazil; the Pirin Mountains of Bulgaria; Bancroft, Ontario, Notre Dame du Laus, Wakefield, and Villedieu Township, Quebec, Canada; Southern and Western Finland; Bavaria and Saxony, Germany; eastern Greenland; Ambasamudram in Tamil Nadu, India; Honshū, Japan; Suan, North Korea; Nordland, Norway; KwaZulu-Natal and Northern Cape Province, South Africa; Andalusia, Spain; Värmland and Västmanland, Sweden; Isle of Skye, Scotland; and the states of California, Colorado, Massachusetts, New Jersey, New Mexico, New York, Oklahoma, Utah, and Washington, US.

Clinohumite also occurs as a minor component of some masses of peridotite from the Earth's mantle emplaced into the Earth's crust and as a very rare component of peridotite xenoliths. These occurrences and implications have been summarized by Luth (2003) in a discussion of the possible importance of the mineral as a significant reservoir of water in the Earth's mantle. Titanium is a minor constituent of clinohumite in most such occurrences. Clinohumite is stable throughout the upper mantle to depths of at least 410 km (250 mi) and is a potential host phase for H (water) in this region of the Earth's interior.

Minerals associated with humite include grossular, wollastonite, forsterite, monticellite, cuspidine, fluoborite, ludwigite, dolomite, calcite, talc, biotite, spinel, vesuvianite, sanidine, meionite and nepheline.

== Crystal structure ==
Crystal structure of clinohumite in polyhedral representation, a-axis projection, b-horizontal. H atom are blue spheres.

The structure is monoclinic with space group P2_{1}/b (a-unique). The unit cell has a = 4.7488 Å; b = 10.2875 Å; c = 13.6967 Å; and alpha = 100.63°; V = 667.65 Å^{3}; Z = 2 for pure Mg hydroxyl-clinohumite. The odd setting of space group P2_{1}/c is chosen to preserve the a and b axes of olivine. The structure is closely related to that of olivine as well as the other humite minerals. Mg and Fe are in octahedral coordination with oxygen and silicon (Si) is in tetrahedral coordination. There are five distinct octahedral sites and two different tetrahedral sites. One of the octahedral sites is bonded to two OH,F atoms and is the site where Ti is partitioned. Clinohumite is a nesosilicate with no oxygen atoms shared between two silicons.

== See also ==
- Alleghanyite
- Chondrodite
- Humite
- Jerrygibbsite
