= Galaxite =

Oxide mineral

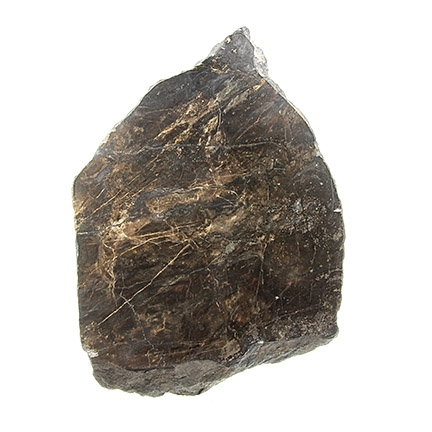
- Galaxite from the Kaso mine, Japan

General
- Category: Oxide minerals Spinel group Normal Spinel structural group
- Formula: MnAl_{2}O_{4}
- IMA symbol: Glx
- Strunz classification: 4.BB.05
- Crystal system: Cubic
- Crystal class: Hexoctahedral (m3̅m); H-M symbol: (4/m 3̅ 2/m)
- Space group: Fd3̅m (no. 227)
- Unit cell: a = 8.271 Å; Z = 8

Identification
- Color: Black, red-brown, red to yellow
- Crystal habit: Octahedra and rounded grains and exolution blebs
- Twinning: Spinel law with {111} as both twin and composition plane
- Cleavage: Indistinct to none
- Fracture: Conchoidal to irregular
- Tenacity: Brittle
- Mohs scale hardness: 7.5
- Luster: Vitreous
- Streak: Red-brown
- Diaphaneity: Opaque; may be translucent in thin section
- Specific gravity: 4.234
- Optical properties: Isotropic
- Refractive index: n = 1.923
- Other characteristics: weakly to moderately magnetic

Galaxite, also known as 'mangan-spinel', is an isometric mineral belonging to the spinel group of oxides with the ideal chemical formula Mn^{2+}Al_{2}O_{4}. It is sometimes used as a gemstone.

== Occurrence ==
It was first described in 1932 for an occurrence at Bald Knob, Alleghany County, North Carolina near its namesakes, the town of Galax, Virginia, named after the plant galax or wandflower which grows in the area.

Galaxite generally occurs as small granular aggregates with a red-brownish tone. It has a vitreous luster and leaves a brownish-red streak. It is rated 7.5 on the Mohs Scale.

It occurs in carbonate-rich metamorphosed manganese ore deposits. It occurs associated with alleghanyite, rhodonite, sonolite, spessartine, tephroite, kutnohorite, manganhumite, jacobsite, kellyite and alabandite in the Bald Knob area. Associated minerals include katoptrite, magnetite, manganostibite, magnussonite, tephroite, manganhumite and manganosite in the Brattfors mine area of Nordmark, Värmland, Sweden.

== Composition ==
Galaxite is the manganese (Mn) rich endmember of the aluminium (Al) series of the spinel group. Divalent iron (Fe) and magnesium (Mg) readily substitute for the manganese in the crystal structure. Trivalent iron may also substitute for the aluminium. Thus, reflecting most natural samples, the formula may be better represented as (Mn,Fe^{2+},Mg)(Al,Fe^{3+})_{2}O_{4}.
