= Humite (mineral group) =

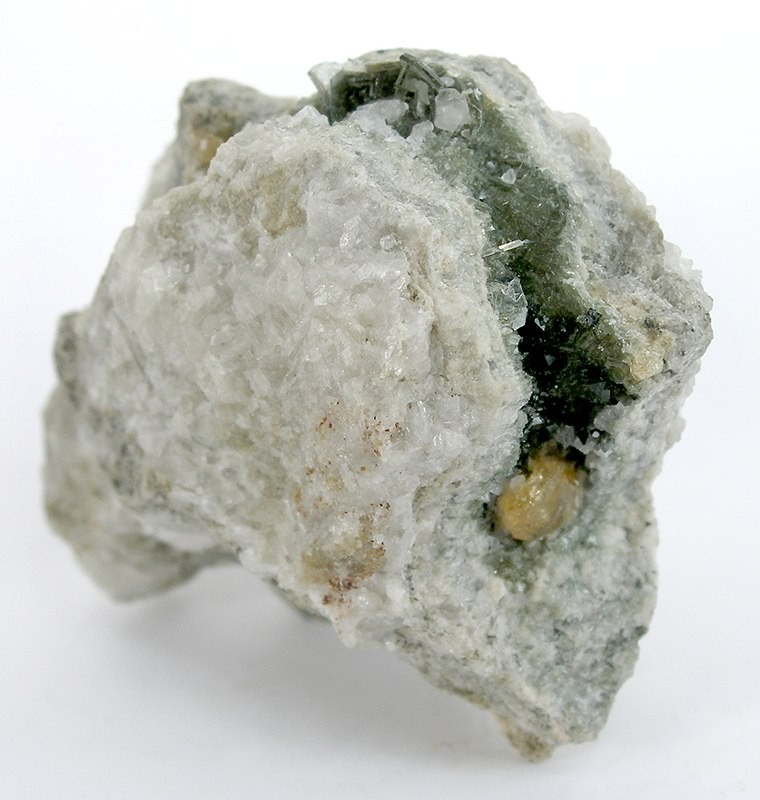
Humite crystal on matrix, Monte Somma, Italy

The humite group is a group of nesosilicates with the general formula A_{n}(SiO_{4})_{m}(F,OH)_{2}.

When A is predominantly magnesium we have the humite subgroup:

- norbergite, Mg_{3}(SiO_{4})(F,OH)_{2}
- chondrodite, (Mg,Fe,Ti)_{5}(SiO_{4})_{2}(F,OH,O)_{2}
- humite, (Mg,Fe)_{7}(SiO_{4})_{3}(F,OH)_{2}
- clinohumite, (Mg,Fe)_{9}(SiO_{4})_{4}(F,OH)_{2}

The manganese-humite subgroup has members

- alleghanyite, (Mn^{2+})_{5}(SiO_{4})_{2}(OH,F)_{2}
- manganhumite, (Mn,Mg)_{7}(SiO_{4})_{3}(OH)_{2}
- sonolite, Mn_{9}(SiO_{4})_{4}(F,OH)_{2}

and the leucophoenicite subgroup has members

- ribbeite, Mn_{5}(SiO_{4})_{2}(OH)_{2}
- leucophoenicite, (Mn,Ca,Mg,Zn)(SiO_{4})_{3}(OH)_{2}
- jerrygibbsite (Mn,Zn)_{9}(SiO_{4})_{4}(OH)_{2}

Chondrodite is the most common member of the humite group. It may contain Ti up to 9.6% TiO_{2}. Chondrodite from Sterling Hill Mine and Franklin Mine contains zinc to 11.5% ZnO and Mn to 36% MnO, and grades to alleghanyite.

The humite minerals commonly alter to serpentine or Mg-rich chlorite and dissolve by weathering, leaving iron oxide residues.
