= Fluoborite =

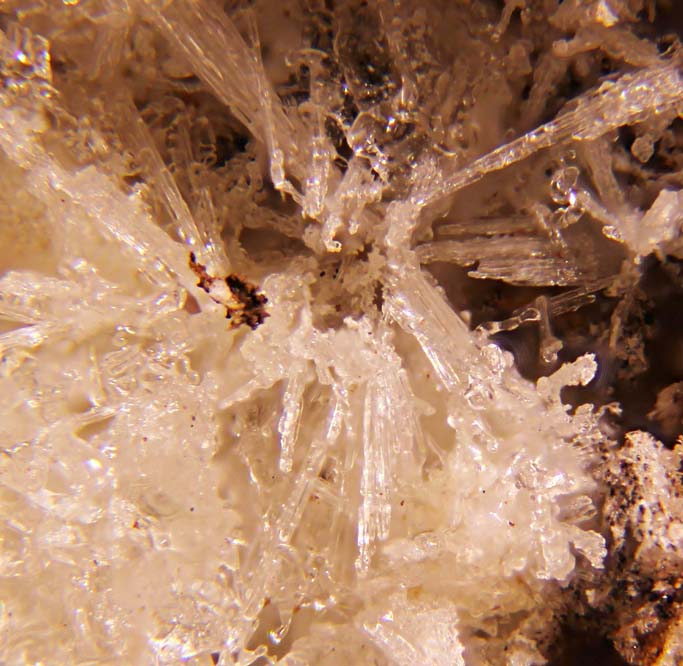
- Fluoborite found in Italy

General
- Category: Borate mineral
- Formula: Mg_{3}(BO_{3})(F,OH)_{3}
- IMA symbol: Fbo
- Strunz classification: 6.AB.50
- Crystal system: Hexagonal
- Crystal class: Dipyramidal (6/m); H-M symbol: (6/m)
- Space group: P6_{3}/m
- Unit cell: a = 8.8612, c = 3.1021 [Å]; Z = 3

Identification
- Formula mass: 186.61 g/mol
- Color: Colorless to violet or white
- Crystal habit: Acicular, prismatic, stellate
- Cleavage: Good on {0001}
- Mohs scale hardness: 3.5
- Luster: Vitreous to silky
- Streak: white
- Diaphaneity: Translucent to transparent
- Specific gravity: 2.98
- Optical properties: Uniaxial (−)
- Refractive index: n_{ω} = 1.570 n_{ε} = 1.534
- Birefringence: 0.036
- Ultraviolet fluorescence: Intense cream-white under SW UV

Fluoborite has a chemical formula of Mg_{3}(BO_{3})(F,OH)_{3}. Its name comes from its main chemical components, fluorine and boron. It was first described in 1926.

Fluoborite's crystal system is hexagonal, meaning it has one six-fold axis of rotation. It also has a mirror plane perpendicular to the c-axis. Fluoborite is uniaxial, just like all other hexagonal minerals. Uniaxial means it has only one optic axis. It is anisotropic. Its relief is low, and it is birefringent.

There are three major settings fluoborite is found. It is found in skarns developed in metamorphosed boron-rich magnesium rocks, contact metamorphosed marble, and in contact metasomatic magnetite deposits. There are two major type localities for fluoborite. One is Tall Mine, Kallmora, Norberg, Västmanland, Sweden. It is an iron mine in a contact metasomatic magnetite deposit. The other type locality is the Huerta del Vinagre mine, Spain.

It occurs associated with ludwigite, chondrodite, magnetite and calcite in the Tallgruvan, Sweden occurrence. It occurs with mooreite, willemite, fluorite, hydrozincite, pyrochroite, zincite and rhodochrosite at Sterling Hill, New Jersey.
