= Jerrygibbsite =

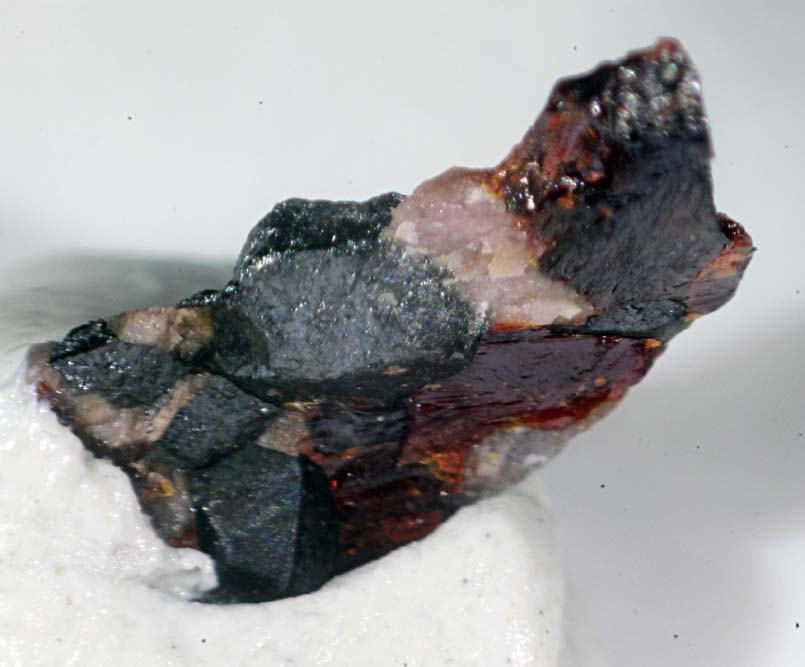
- Jerrygibbsite (pink) found in New Jersey

General
- Category: Nesosilicates
- Formula: (Mn,Zn)_{9}(SiO_{4})_{4}(OH)_{2}
- IMA symbol: Jgb
- Strunz classification: 9.AF.70
- Crystal system: Orthorhombic
- Crystal class: Pyramidal (mm2); H-M symbol: (mm2)
- Space group: Pbn2_{1}
- Unit cell: a = 4.85, b = 10.7 c = 28.17 [Å]; Z = 4

Identification
- Color: Violet-pink, with a brownish tinge
- Crystal habit: Interlocking anhedral crystals
- Cleavage: Imperfect on {001}
- Mohs scale hardness: 5.5
- Luster: Vitreous
- Streak: Light pink
- Diaphaneity: Alternating transparent and translucent lamellae
- Specific gravity: 4.00
- Optical properties: Biaxial (−)
- Refractive index: n_{α} = 1.772 n_{β} = 1.783 n_{γ} = 1.789
- Birefringence: δ = 0.017
- 2V angle: Measured: 72°

Jerrygibbsite is a rare silicate mineral with the chemical formula (Mn,Zn)_{9}(SiO_{4})_{4}(OH)_{2}. Jerrygibbsite was originally discovered by Pete J. Dunn in 1984, who named it after mineralogist Gerald V. Gibbs (born 1929). It has only been reported from the type locality of Franklin Furnace, New Jersey, United States, and in Namibia's Otjozondjupa region. Jerrygibbsite is member of the leucophoenite family of the humite group. It is always found with these two minerals. It is a dimorph of sonolite.

== Discovery ==
The mineral jerrygibbsite was discovered in 1984 by Pete Dunn while conducting an X-ray spectrographic analysis of a sample previously assumed to be leucophoenicite. All samples found of jerrygibbsite are impure. All are incorporated within leucophoenicite, many by mixed layering, and tend to be found with many manganese humites such as sonolite. Physical properties are similar to those of leucophoenicite and sonolite, including hardness, coloring, and density.

== Composition ==
The formula for jerrygibbsite is ((Mn,Zn)_{9}(SiO_{4})_{4}(OH)_{2}, although it often contains impurities of iron, magnesium, calcium or water. The idealized formula is Mn_{9}(SiO_{4})_{4}(OH)_{2} which is the same ideal formula as sonolite, a member of the humite group. Jerrygibbsite has been found to be dimorphous with sonolite.

== Geologic occurrence ==
Jerrygibbsite has been found only in the Franklin Furnace mine in Franklin, New Jersey, and in the Kombat Mines in Namibia. Most of the minerals in the humite group have been found only here, as well as leucophoenicite. Jerrygibbsite has been found to occur in contact with willemite, zincite, and sonolite in an uncommon assemblage. Jerrygibbsite typically occurs as a massive mineral in interlocking anhedral crystals, up to 0.5 mm × 2.0 mm, which display a typical metamorphic texture. Subsequent finds from the Namibia mines were of two different textures.

== Physical properties ==
Jerrygibbsite, in pure form, is a violet-pink mineral with a light pink streak. It has a calculated density of 4.045 g/cm^{3}, and a tested density of 4.00 g/cm^{3}, agreeing favorably, since measurements used to test density have few significant figures. It has a hardness of about 5.5, that of a knife blade. The general luster is vitreous, or shiny. Crystals are generally transparent to translucent. Crystals are not luminescent or fluorescent. Jerrygibbsite forms orthorhombic crystals with an imperfect cleavage along the {001} plane, which can be seen by opaque lamellae alternating with the transparent jerrygibbsite. Optically, jerrygibbsite is negative biaxial with 2V = 72˚ and a maximum birefringence of 0.017. In thin section, jerrygibbsite appears light pink. The crystal structure described by Kato is the equivalent of a unit-cell-twinned sonolite in which the cells are related by a b/4 glide plane.

== See also ==
- Alleghanyite
- Chondrodite
- Clinohumite
- Humite
