= Chondrodite =

Nesosilicate mineral

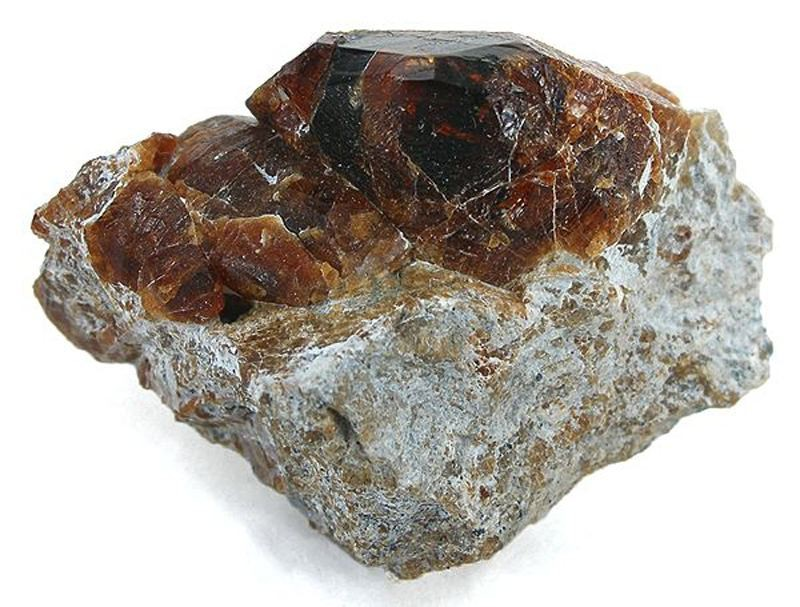

General
- Category: Nesosilicates
- Formula: Mg_{5}(SiO_{4})_{2}F_{2}
- IMA symbol: Chn
- Strunz classification: 9.AF.45 (10th edition); 8/B.04-20 (8th edition)
- Dana classification: 52.3.2b.2
- Crystal system: Monoclinic
- Crystal class: Prismatic (2/m) (same H-M symbol)
- Space group: P2_{1}/a

Identification
- Formula mass: 351.6 g/mol
- Color: Yellow, orange, red or brown, rarely colorless
- Crystal habit: Typically anhedral masses or grains, or as plates flattened on {010}, {001} or {100}.
- Twinning: Simple or multiple twinning common on {001}, also reported on {105} and {305}.
- Cleavage: Poor to good on (001)
- Fracture: Conchoidal to uneven
- Tenacity: Brittle
- Mohs scale hardness: 6 to 6.5
- Luster: Vitreous to greasy
- Streak: Grey or yellow
- Diaphaneity: Translucent
- Specific gravity: 3.1 to 3.26
- Optical properties: Biaxial(+)
- Refractive index: n_{α} = 1.592 – 1.643, n_{β} = 1.602 – 1.655, n_{γ} = 1.619 – 1.675,
- Birefringence: 0.027 – 0.032
- Pleochroism: X golden yellow to orange, Y and Z light yellow to almost colorless
- Solubility: Soluble in HCl and H_{2}SO_{4}
- Other characteristics: Some specimens fluoresce orange yellow under shortwave and orange under longwave UV. Not radioactive.

Chondrodite is a nesosilicate mineral with formula (Mg,Fe)_{5}(SiO_{4})_{2}(F,OH,O)_{2}. Although it is a fairly rare mineral, it is the most frequently encountered member of the humite group of minerals. It is formed in hydrothermal deposits from locally metamorphosed dolomite. It is also found associated with skarn and serpentinite. It was discovered in 1817 at Pargas in Finland, and named from the Greek for "granule", which is a common habit for this mineral.

== Formula ==
Mg_{5}(SiO_{4})_{2}F_{2} is the end member formula as given by the International Mineralogical Association, molar mass 351.6 g. There is usually some OH in the F sites, however, and Fe and Ti can substitute for Mg, so the formula for the naturally occurring mineral is better written (Mg,Fe,Ti)_{5}(SiO_{4})_{2}(F,OH,O)_{2}.

== Structure ==
The chondrodite structure is based on a slightly distorted hexagonal close packed array of anions O, OH and F with metal ions in the octahedral sites resulting in zigzag chains of M(O,OH,F)_{6} octahedra. Chains are staggered so that none of the independent tetrahedral sites occupied by Si has OH or F corners. Half of the octahedral sites are filled by divalent cations, principally Mg, and one tenth of the tetrahedral sites are filled by Si. There are three distinct octahedra in the array: Fe is ordered in the M1 sites but not in the larger M2 and smaller M3 sites. Ti is ordered in the M3 positions, which are the smallest, but Ti concentration appears never to exceed 0.5 atoms Ti per formula unit in natural specimens. In the humite series Mg^{2+} is replaced by Fe^{2+}, Mn^{2+}, Ca^{2+} and Zn^{2+} in that order of abundance, though Mg^{2+} always predominates.

== Unit cell ==
Space group: P2_{1}/b Unit cell parameters:
Synthetic F end member a = 7.80 Å, b = 4.75 Å, c = 10.27 Å, beta = 109.2^{o}.

Synthetic OH end member a = 7.914 Å, b = 4.752 Å, c = 10.350 Å, beta = 108.71^{o}.

Natural chondrodite has a = 7.867 to 7.905 Å, b = 4.727 to 4.730 Å, c = 10.255 to 10.318 Å, beta = 109.0^{o} to 109.33^{o}. Z = 2.

== Color ==
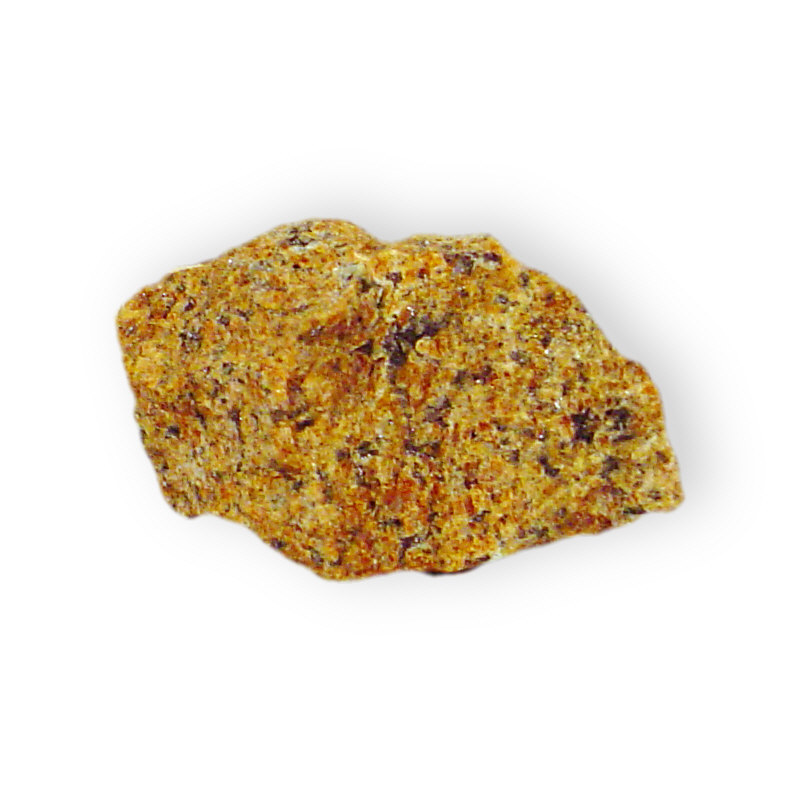
Chondrodite with magnetite, Tilly Foster mine, Brewster, New York, US

Chondrodite is yellow, orange, red or brown, or rarely colorless, but zoning of different color intensity is common, and intergrown plates of chondrodite, humite, clinohumite, forsterite and monticellite have been reported.

== Optical properties ==
Chondrodite is biaxial(+), with refractive indices variously reported as n_{α} = 1.592 – 1.643, n_{β} = 1.602 – 1.655, n_{γ} = 1.619 – 1.675, birefringence = 0.025 – 0.037, and 2V measured as 64° to 90°, calculated: 76° to 78°. Refractive indices tend to increase from norbergite to clinohumite in the humite group. They also increase with Fe^{2+} and Ti^{4+} and with (OH)^{−} substituting for F^{−}. Dispersion: r > v.

== Environment ==
Chondrodite is found largely in metamorphic contact zones between carbonate rocks and acidic or alkaline intrusions where fluorine has been introduced by metasomatic processes. It is formed by the hydration of olivine, (Mg,Fe^{2+})_{2}SiO_{4}, and is stable over a range of temperatures and pressures that include those existing in a portion of the uppermost mantle.

Titanian chondrodite has been found as inclusions in olivine in serpentinite in West Greenland, where it is associated with clinohumite, olivine, magnesite, magnetite and Ni-Co-Pb sulfides in a matrix of antigorite.

== See also ==
- Clinohumite
- Alleghanyite
- Humite
- Classification of minerals
- List of minerals
