= Samuel Lewis Penfield =

American chemist (1856–1906)

Samuel Lewis Penfield (January 16, 1856 – August 12, 1906) was an American analytic chemist, mineralogist, and crystallographer who first obtained the chemical structures of more than two dozen naturally occurring minerals.

== Biography ==
Penfield prepared for college at the Catskill Academy and the academy at Wilbraham, Massachusetts. He matriculated at Yale in the Sheffield Scientific School in 1873, graduating with honors in 1877 and becoming a scientific assistant in chemistry and in mineralology. Except for brief periods abroad, in Germany (where he trained in crystallography), his entire subsequent career was to be at Yale. In early work, He analyzed the then-new so-called Branchville phosphates, fairfieldite and fillowite, as well as samples of chabazite and rhodocrosite from the same locality. He was soon known as expert in analyzing minerals containing fluorine.

Penfield became assistant professor of mineralogy in 1888, and was advanced to full professorship in 1893, soon taking charge of the mineralogical department. Among minerals whose chemical composition he was instrumental in elucidating (often in collaboration with others) were the new minerals Nesquehonite, Canfieldite, Pearceite, Clinohedrite, Hancockite, Glaucochroite, Graftonite, as well as known minerals that existed in samples but were unanalyzed: Monazite, Herderite, Howlite, Connellite, Aurichalcite, Argyrodite, Cookeite, and a long list of others, including notably Turquoise in which the occurrence of copper in this phosphate was explained. Of eighteen minerals that he discovered and named, just two were later shown to be duplications of ones previously discovered.

Penfield's scientific work may be summarized as comprising mineralogical investigations of great abundance, variety, accuracy, and importance. The thoroughness with which his work was carried out is also particularly striking. In some cases, he was able to predict the existence of minerals not yet discovered. Penfield insisted on careful purification of every mineral he analyzed and gave a full statement in each of his papers of just what purification procedure he used. He often checked his methods by the analysis of material of known composition.

His honorary memberships included Fellow of the American Academy of Arts and Sciences (1893), Foreign Correspondent of the Geological Society of London (1896), Member of the National Academy of Sciences (1900), Fellow of the American Association for the Advancement of Science, Corresponding Member of the Royal Society at Göttingen (now Göttingen Academy of Sciences and Humanities), Member of the Scientific Society at Christiania (now the Norwegian Academy of Sciences, 1902), Corresponding Member of the Geological Society at Stockholm, and Foreign Member of the Mineralogical Society of Great Britain (1903).

Penfield remained unmarried for twenty years after his graduation from college and lived in an apartment in South Sheffield Hall. He was married in 1897 and died in 1906.
