= Fayalite =

Iron end-member of olivine, a nesosilicate mineral

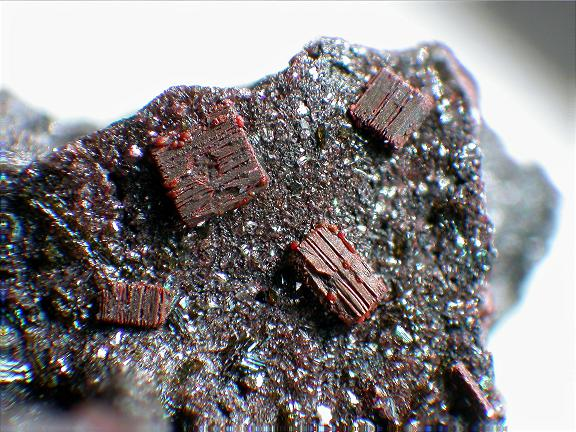
- Fayalite crystals on substrate. Sample collected from Ochtendung, Eifel, Germany

General
- Category: Nesosilicate
- Formula: Fe_{2}SiO_{4}
- IMA symbol: Fa
- Strunz classification: 9.AC.05
- Crystal system: Orthorhombic
- Crystal class: Dipyramidal (mmm); H-M symbol: (2/m 2/m 2/m)
- Space group: Pbnm (no. 62)
- Unit cell: a = 4.8211, b = 10.4779 c = 6.0889 [Å]; Z = 4

Identification
- Formula mass: 203.771 g·mol^{−1}
- Color: Greenish yellow, yellow-brown, brown; pale yellow to amber in thin section
- Crystal habit: Commonly granular, compact, or massive
- Twinning: On [100]; also on [031], as trillings
- Cleavage: {010} moderate, {100} imperfect
- Fracture: Conchoidal
- Mohs scale hardness: 6.5–7.0
- Luster: Vitreous to resinous on fractures
- Streak: White
- Diaphaneity: Transparent
- Specific gravity: 4.392
- Optical properties: Biaxial (−)
- Refractive index: n_{α} = 1.731–1.824, n_{β} = 1.760–1.864, n_{γ} = 1.773–1.875
- Birefringence: δ = 0.042–0.051
- Pleochroism: Faint
- 2V angle: Measured: 74° to 47°, calculated: 54° to 66°

Fayalite (Fe_{2}SiO_{4}, commonly abbreviated to Fa) is the iron-rich end-member of the olivine solid-solution series. In common with all minerals in the olivine group, fayalite crystallizes in the orthorhombic system (space group Pbnm) with cell parameters a = 4.82 Å, b = 10.48 Å and c = 6.09 Å.

Fayalite forms solid solution series with the magnesium olivine endmember forsterite (Mg_{2}SiO_{4}) and also with the manganese rich olivine endmember tephroite (Mn_{2}SiO_{4}).

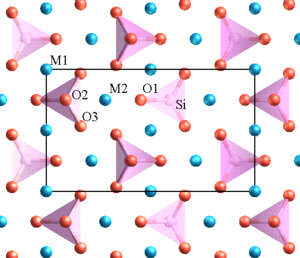
The atomic scale structure of fayalite looking along the A axis. Oxygen is shown in red, silicon in pink, and iron in blue. A projection of the unit cell is shown by the black rectangle.

Iron rich olivine is a relatively common constituent of acidic and alkaline igneous rocks such as volcanic obsidians, rhyolites, trachytes and phonolites and plutonic quartz syenites where it is associated with amphiboles. Its main occurrence is in ultramafic volcanic and plutonic rocks and less commonly in felsic plutonic rocks and rarely in granite pegmatite. It also occurs in lithophysae in obsidian. It also occurs in medium-grade thermally metamorphosed iron-rich sediments and in impure carbonate rocks.

Fayalite is stable with quartz at low pressures, whereas more magnesian olivine is not, because of the reaction olivine + quartz = orthopyroxene. Iron stabilizes the olivine + quartz pair. The pressure and compositional dependence of the reaction can be used to calculate constraints on pressures at which assemblages of olivine + quartz formed.

Fayalite can also react with oxygen to produce magnetite + quartz: the three minerals together make up the "FMQ" oxygen buffer. The reaction is used to control the fugacity of oxygen in laboratory experiments. It can also be used to calculate the fugacity of oxygen recorded by mineral assemblages in metamorphic and igneous processes.

Molar volume vs. pressure at room temperature

At high pressure, fayalite undergoes a phase transition to ahrensite, the iron-bearing analogue of ringwoodite, i.e., contrary to forsterite there is no intermediate form analogous to wadsleyite; under the conditions prevailing in the upper mantle of the Earth, the transition would occur at ca. 6–7 GPa, i.e., at substantially lower pressure than the phase transitions of forsterite. In high-pressure experiments, the transformation may be delayed, so that it may remain stable to pressures of almost 35 GPa (see fig.), at which point it may become amorphous rather than take on a crystalline structure such as ahrensite.

The name fayalite is derived from Faial (Fayal) Island in the Azores where it was first described in 1840.

== See also ==
- Forsterite, (Mg_{2}SiO_{4}), the magnesium-rich end-member of the olivine solid-solution series.
- Mineral redox buffer
