= Manganosite =

Rare manganese(II) oxide mineral: MnO

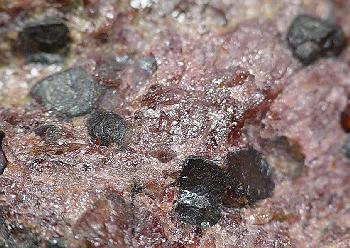
- Black manganosite crystals with zincite and sonolite

General
- Category: Oxide mineral
- Formula: Manganese oxide, MnO
- IMA symbol: Mng
- Strunz classification: 4.AB.25
- Crystal system: Cubic
- Crystal class: Hexoctahedral (m3̅m); H-M symbol: (4/m 3̅ 2/m)
- Space group: Fm3̅m
- Unit cell: a = 4.44 Å; Z = 4

Identification
- Color: Emerald-green, becoming black on exposure to air
- Crystal habit: Granular to massive; Octahedral crystals uncommon
- Cleavage: Perfect on [100], [010] and [001]
- Fracture: Fibrous
- Mohs scale hardness: 5–6
- Luster: Vitreous, adamantine to dull
- Streak: Brown
- Diaphaneity: Transparent to translucent
- Specific gravity: 5.364
- Optical properties: Isotropic
- Refractive index: n = 2.16–2.17

Manganosite is a rare mineral composed of manganese(II) oxide MnO. It was first described in 1817 for an occurrence in the Harz Mountains, Saxony-Anhalt, Germany. It has also been reported from Langban and Nordmark, Sweden and at Franklin Furnace, New Jersey. It also occurs in Japan, Kyrgyzstan and Burkina Faso.

It occurs in manganese nodules. It also occurs as alteration of manganese minerals such as rhodocrosite during low oxygen metamorphism and metasomatism.
