= Cuspidine =

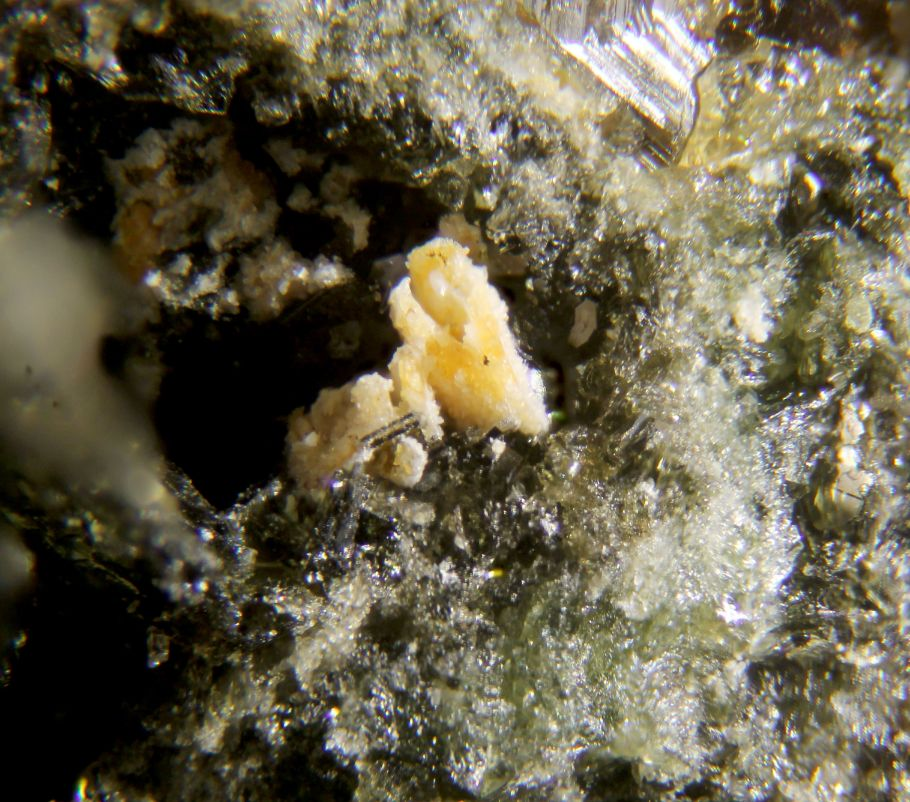
- Yellowish cuspidine crystals from the type locality at Mount Vesuvius

General
- Category: Sorosilicate
- Formula: Ca_{4}(Si_{2}O_{7})(F,OH)_{2}
- IMA symbol: Csp
- Strunz classification: 9.BE.17
- Crystal system: Monoclinic
- Crystal class: Prismatic (2/m) (same H-M symbol)
- Space group: P2_{1}/c
- Unit cell: a = 10.93 Å, b = 10.57 Å, c = 7.57 Å; β = 110.11°; Z=4

Identification
- Color: Colorless, tan, light brown, pale red
- Crystal habit: Minute spearhead-shaped crystals, acicular, granular
- Twinning: Simple, lamellar, polysynthetic on {100}
- Cleavage: Good on {001} imperfect on {110}
- Fracture: Uneven
- Tenacity: Brittle
- Mohs scale hardness: 5–6
- Luster: Vitreous
- Diaphaneity: Transparent to translucent
- Specific gravity: 2.85–2.96
- Optical properties: Biaxial (+)
- Refractive index: n_{α} = 1.586 – 1.594 n_{β} = 1.589 – 1.596 n_{γ} = 1.598 – 1.606
- Birefringence: δ = 0.012
- 2V angle: Measured: 59° to 71°

Cuspidine is a fluorine bearing calcium silicate mineral (sorosilicate) with formula: Ca_{4}(Si_{2}O_{7})(F,OH)_{2}. Cuspidine crystallizes in the monoclinic crystal system and occurs as acicular to spear shaped pale red to light brown crystals. It is a member of the wöhlerite group.

Cuspidine was first described in 1876 for an occurrence in Monte Somma, Italy. The name is from the Greek cuspis for spear from its characteristic crystal form. Cuspidine occurs as crystals in tuff from Monte Somma. In the Franklin, New Jersey mine area it occurs in contact metamorphosed limestone. In Dupezeh Mountain, Iraq, it occurs in melilite bearing skarn. Associated minerals include augite, hornblende, diopside, grossular, biotite, phlogopite, monticellite, wollastonite, calcite, spinel, magnetite and perovskite.
