= Alleghanyite =

Nesosilicate mineral

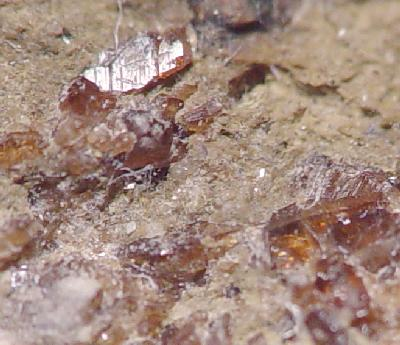
- Alleghanyite crystals up to 2 mm in size in a mixed franklinite/calcite/willemite block of 11×6.5×4 cm size. Location: Sterling Mine, Sussex County, New Jersey, US.

General
- Category: Nesosilicates; Humite group
- Formula: Mn_{5}(SiO_{4})_{2}(OH)_{2}
- IMA symbol: Alh
- Strunz classification: 9.AF.45
- Dana classification: 52.3.2b.1
- Crystal system: Monoclinic
- Crystal class: Prismatic (2/m) (same H-M symbol)
- Space group: P2_{1}/a
- Unit cell: a = 10.46, b = 4.86 c = 8.3 [Å]; β = 109.133°; Z = 2

Identification
- Formula mass: 492.87 g/mol
- Color: Brown, bright pink, grayish pink, white
- Crystal habit: Granular; anhedral to subhedral crystals in matrix
- Cleavage: None
- Fracture: Conchoidal
- Tenacity: Brittle
- Mohs scale hardness: 5–6
- Luster: Vitreous
- Diaphaneity: Transparent to translucent
- Specific gravity: 4 (meas.), 4.11 (calc.)
- Optical properties: Biaxial (−)
- Refractive index: n_{α} = 1.756 n_{β} = 1.78 n_{γ} = 1.792
- Birefringence: 0.036
- 2V angle: 72° (meas.), 68° (calc.)
- Other characteristics: Non-fluorescent

Alleghanyite is a moderately rare humite mineral with formula Mn_{5}(SiO_{4})_{2}(OH)_{2}, belonging to the nesosilicates class. In general its occurrences are related with metamorphic (metamorphosed) manganese deposits. The mineral is named after Alleghany County, North Carolina, US.

== See also ==
- Chondrodite
- Clinohumite
- Humite
- Jerrygibbsite
