= Olivine =

Mineral of magnesium iron silicate

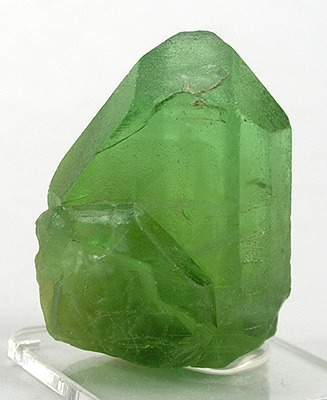

General
- Category: Nesosilicate; Olivine group Olivine series
- Formula: (Mg, Fe, Mn)_{2}SiO_{4}
- IMA symbol: Ol
- Strunz classification: 9.AC.05
- Crystal system: Orthorhombic
- Space group: Pbnm (no. 62)

Identification
- Color: Yellow to yellow-green
- Crystal habit: Massive to granular
- Cleavage: Poor
- Fracture: Conchoidal
- Tenacity: brittle
- Mohs scale hardness: 6.5–7.0
- Luster: Vitreous
- Streak: colorless or white
- Diaphaneity: Transparent to translucent
- Density: 3.2–4.5
- Optical properties: Biaxial (+)
- Refractive index: n_{α} = 1.630–1.650 n_{β} = 1.650–1.670 n_{γ} = 1.670–1.690
- Birefringence: δ = 0.040

The mineral olivine (/ˈɒl.ɪˌviːn/) is a magnesium iron silicate with the chemical formula (MgFe)_{2}SiO_{4}. It is a type of nesosilicate or orthosilicate. The primary component of the Earth's upper mantle, it is a common mineral in Earth's subsurface, but weathers quickly on the surface. Olivine has many uses, such as the gemstone peridot (or chrysolite), as well as industrial applications like metalworking processes.

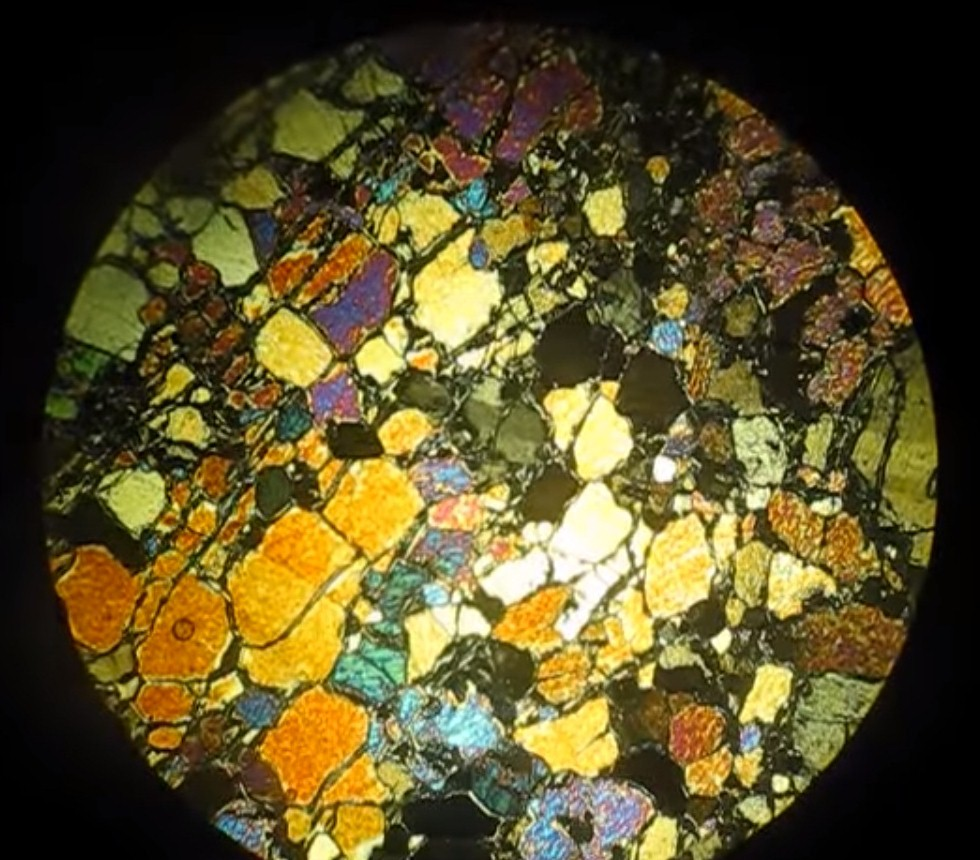
Olivine in cross-polarized light

The ratio of magnesium to iron varies between the two endmembers of the solid solution series: forsterite (Mg-endmember: Mg_{2}SiO_{4}) and fayalite (Fe-endmember: Fe_{2}SiO_{4}). Compositions of olivine are commonly expressed as molar percentages of forsterite (Fo) or fayalite (Fa) (e.g., Fo_{70}Fa_{30}, or just Fo_{70} with Fa_{30} implied). Forsterite's melting temperature is unusually high at atmospheric pressure, almost 1,900 °C (3,450 °F), while fayalite's is much lower – about 1,200 °C (2,190 °F). Melting temperature varies smoothly between the two endmembers, as do other properties. Olivine incorporates only minor amounts of elements other than oxygen (O), silicon (Si), magnesium (Mg), and iron (Fe). Manganese (Mn) and nickel (Ni) commonly are the additional elements present in highest concentrations.

Olivine gives its name to the group of minerals with a related structure (the olivine group) – which includes tephroite (Mn_{2}SiO_{4}), monticellite (CaMgSiO_{4}), larnite (Ca_{2}SiO_{4}) and kirschsteinite (CaFeSiO_{4}) (commonly also spelled kirschteinite).

Olivine's crystal structure incorporates aspects of the orthorhombic P Bravais lattice, which arise from each silica (SiO_{4}) unit being joined by metal divalent cations with each oxygen in SiO_{4} bound to three metal ions. It has a spinel-like structure similar to magnetite but uses one quadrivalent and two divalent cations M^{2+}_{2}M^{4+}O_{4} instead of two trivalent and one divalent cations.

== Identification and paragenesis ==
Olivine is named for its typically olive-green color, thought to be a result of traces of nickel, though it may alter to a reddish color from the oxidation of iron.

Translucent olivine is sometimes used as a gemstone called peridot. It is also called chrysolite (or chrysolithe, from the Greek words for gold and stone), though this name is now rarely used in the English language. Some of the finest gem-quality olivine has been obtained from a body of mantle rocks on Zabargad Island in the Red Sea.

Olivine occurs in both mafic and ultramafic igneous rocks and as a primary mineral in certain metamorphic rocks. Mg-rich olivine crystallizes from magma that is rich in magnesium and low in silica. That magma crystallizes to mafic rocks such as gabbro and basalt. Ultramafic rocks usually contain substantial olivine, and those with an olivine content of over 40% are described as peridotites. Dunite has an olivine content of over 90% and is likely a cumulate formed by olivine crystallizing and settling out of magma or a vein mineral lining magma conduits. Olivine and high pressure structural variants constitute over 50% of the Earth's upper mantle, and olivine is one of the Earth's most common minerals by volume. The metamorphism of impure dolomite or other sedimentary rocks with high magnesium and low silica content also produces Mg-rich olivine, or forsterite.

Fe-rich olivine fayalite is relatively much less common, but it occurs in igneous rocks in small amounts in rare granites and rhyolites, and extremely Fe-rich olivine can exist stably with quartz and tridymite. In contrast, Mg-rich olivine does not occur stably with silica minerals, as it would react with them to form orthopyroxene ((Mg,Fe)_{2}Si_{2}O_{6}).

Mg-rich olivine is stable to pressures equivalent to a depth of about 410 km (250 mi) within Earth. Because it is thought to be the most abundant mineral in Earth's mantle at shallower depths, the properties of olivine have a dominant influence upon the rheology of that part of Earth and hence upon the solid flow that drives plate tectonics. Experiments have documented that olivine at high pressures (12 GPa, the pressure at depths of about 360 km (220 mi)) can contain at least as much as about 8900 parts per million (weight) of water, and that such water content drastically reduces the resistance of olivine to solid flow. Moreover, because olivine is so abundant, more water may be dissolved in olivine of the mantle than is contained in Earth's oceans.

Olivine pine forest (a plant community) is unique to Norway. It is rare and found on dry olivine ridges in the fjord districts of Sunnmøre and Nordfjord.

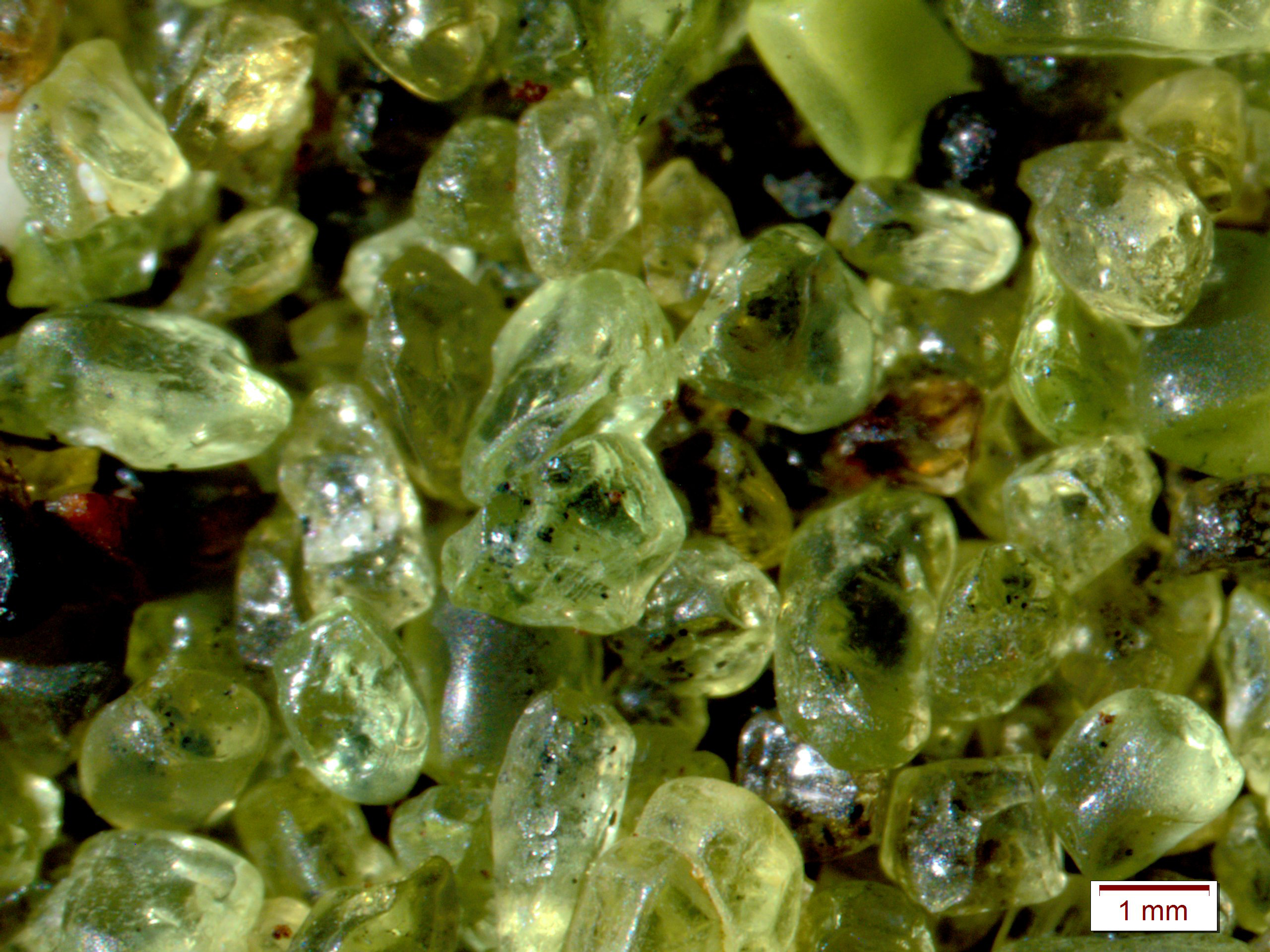
Olivine grains that eroded from lava on Papakolea Beach, Hawaii

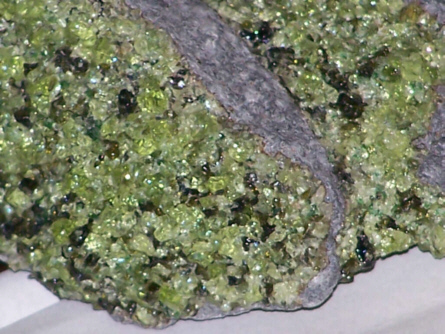
Light green olivine crystals in peridotite xenoliths in basalt from Arizona

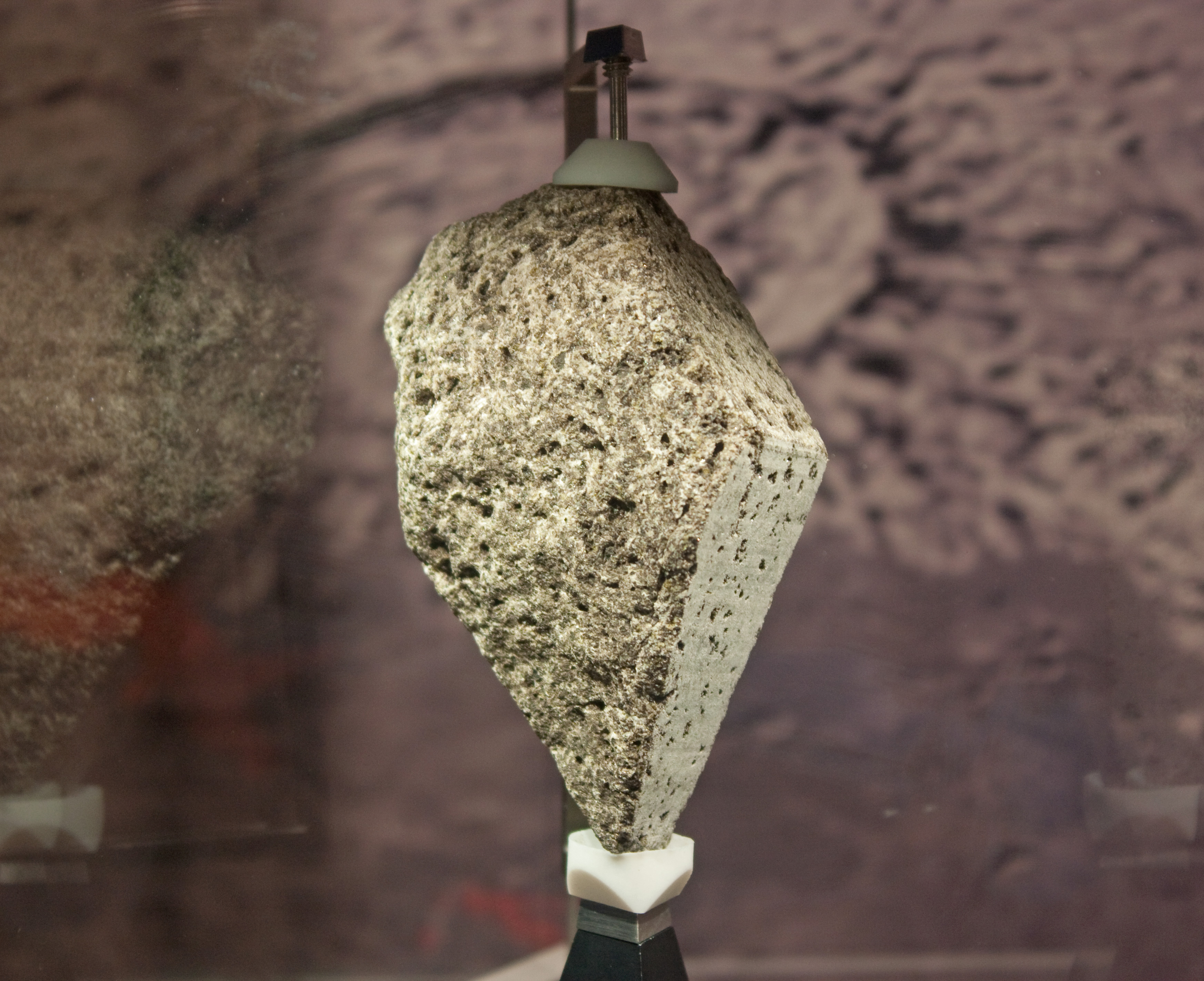
Olivine basalt from the Moon, collected in 1971 by the crew of Apollo 15

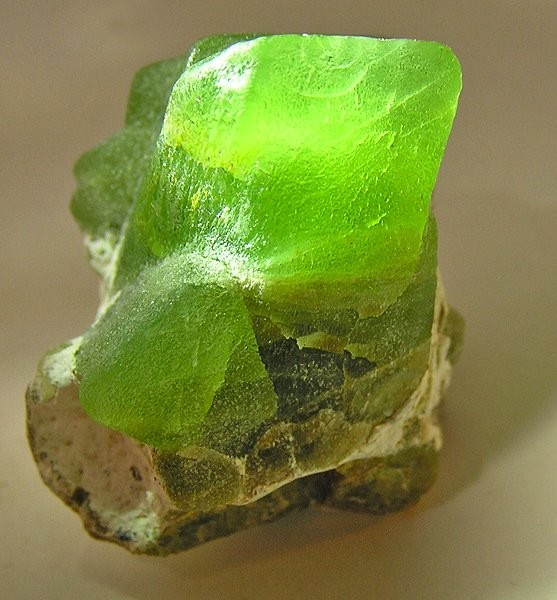
Bright green olivine from Pakistan, showing chisel termination and silky luster

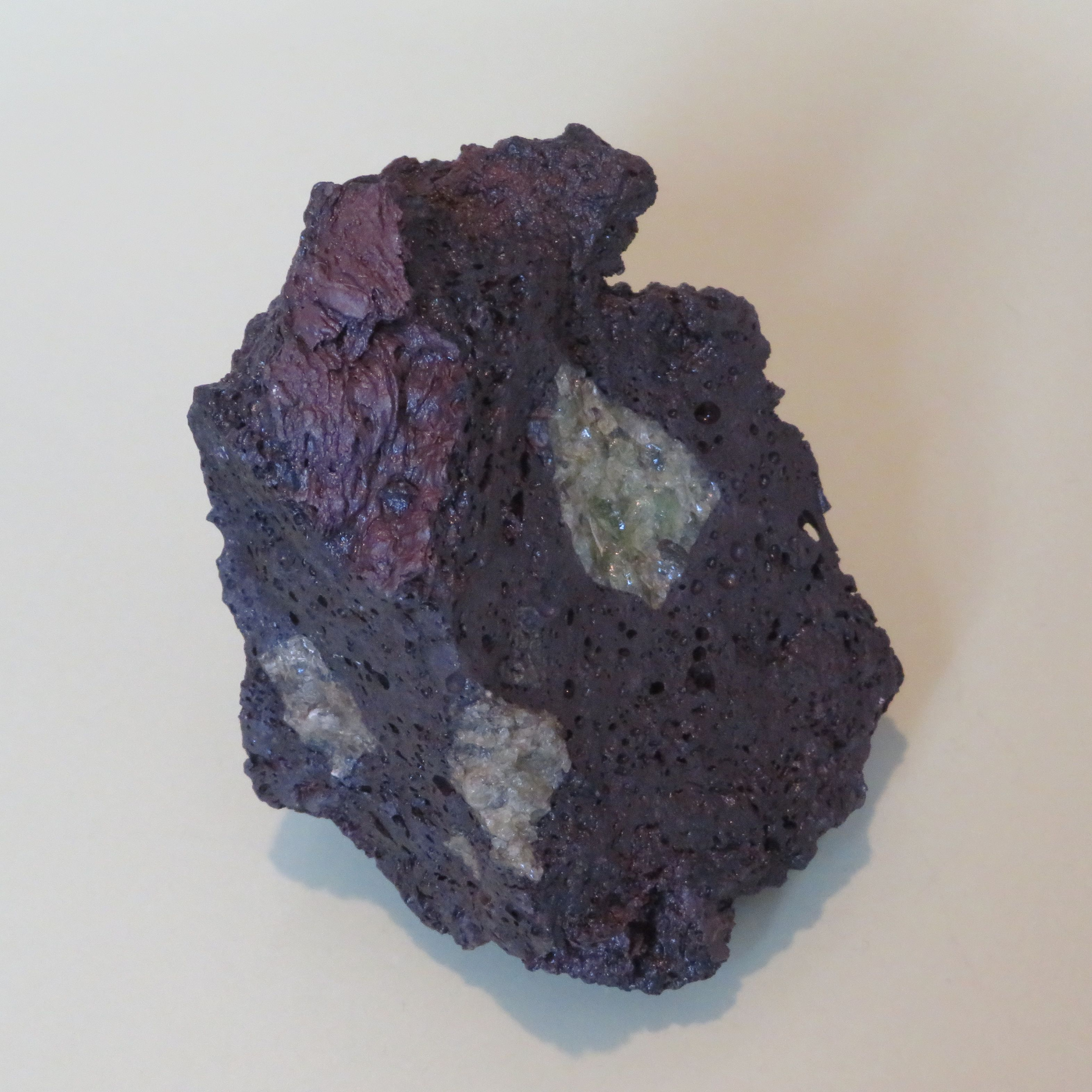
Olivine in lava from the Azores

=== Extraterrestrial occurrences ===
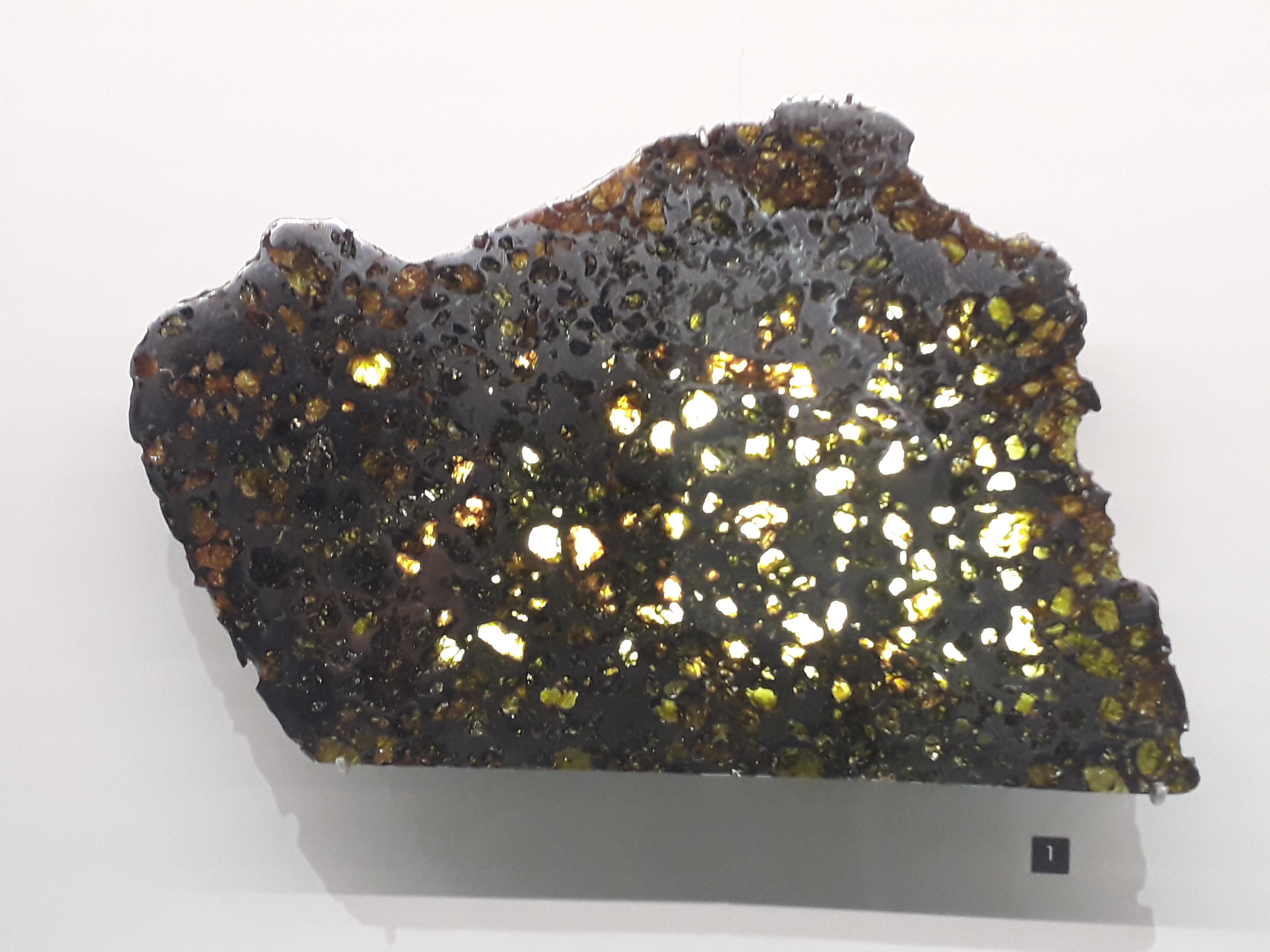
Crystals of olivine embedded in iron, in a slice of Esquel, a pallasite meteorite

Mg-rich olivine has also been discovered in meteorites, on the Moon and Mars, falling into infant stars, as well as on asteroid 25143 Itokawa. Such meteorites include chondrites, collections of debris from the early Solar System; and pallasites, mixes of iron-nickel and olivine. The rare A-type asteroids are suspected to have a surface dominated by olivine.

The spectral signature of olivine has been seen in the dust disks around young stars. The tails of comets (which formed from the dust disk around the young Sun) often have the spectral signature of olivine, and the presence of olivine was verified in samples of a comet from the Stardust spacecraft in 2006. Comet-like (magnesium-rich) olivine has also been detected in the planetesimal belt around the star Beta Pictoris.

== Crystal structure ==
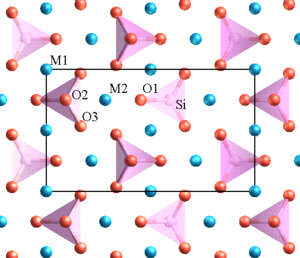
The atomic scale structure of olivine looking along the a axis. Oxygen is shown in red, silicon in pink, and magnesium/iron in blue. A projection of the unit cell is shown by the black rectangle.

Minerals in the olivine group crystallize in the orthorhombic system (space group Pbnm) with isolated silicate tetrahedra, meaning that olivine is a nesosilicate. The structure can be described as a hexagonal, close-packed array of oxygen ions with half of the octahedral sites occupied with magnesium or iron ions and one-eighth of the tetrahedral sites occupied by silicon ions.

There are three distinct oxygen sites (marked O1, O2 and O3 in the figure), two distinct metal sites (M1 and M2) and only one distinct silicon site. O1, O2, M2 and Si all lie on mirror planes, while M1 exists on an inversion center. O3 lies in a general position.

== High-pressure polymorphs ==
At the high temperatures and pressures found at depth within the Earth the olivine structure is no longer stable. Below depths of about 410 km (250 mi) olivine undergoes an exothermic phase transition to the sorosilicate, wadsleyite and, at about 520 km (320 mi) depth, wadsleyite transforms exothermically into ringwoodite, which has the spinel structure. At a depth of about 660 km (410 mi), ringwoodite decomposes into silicate perovskite ((Mg,Fe)SiO_{3}) and ferropericlase ((Mg,Fe)O) in an endothermic reaction. These phase transitions lead to a discontinuous increase in the density of the Earth's mantle that can be observed by seismic methods. They are also thought to influence the dynamics of mantle convection in that the exothermic transitions reinforce flow across the phase boundary, whereas the endothermic reaction hampers it.

The pressure at which these phase transitions occur depends on temperature and iron content. At 800 °C (1,070 K; 1,470 °F), the pure magnesium end member, forsterite, transforms to wadsleyite at 11.8 gigapascals (116,000 atm) and to ringwoodite at pressures above 14 GPa (138,000 atm). Increasing the iron content decreases the pressure of the phase transition and narrows the wadsleyite stability field. At about 0.8 mole fraction fayalite, olivine transforms directly to ringwoodite over the pressure range 10.0 to 11.5 GPa (99,000–113,000 atm). Fayalite transforms to Fe_{2}SiO_{4} spinel at pressures below 5 GPa (49,000 atm). Increasing the temperature increases the pressure of these phase transitions.

== Weathering ==
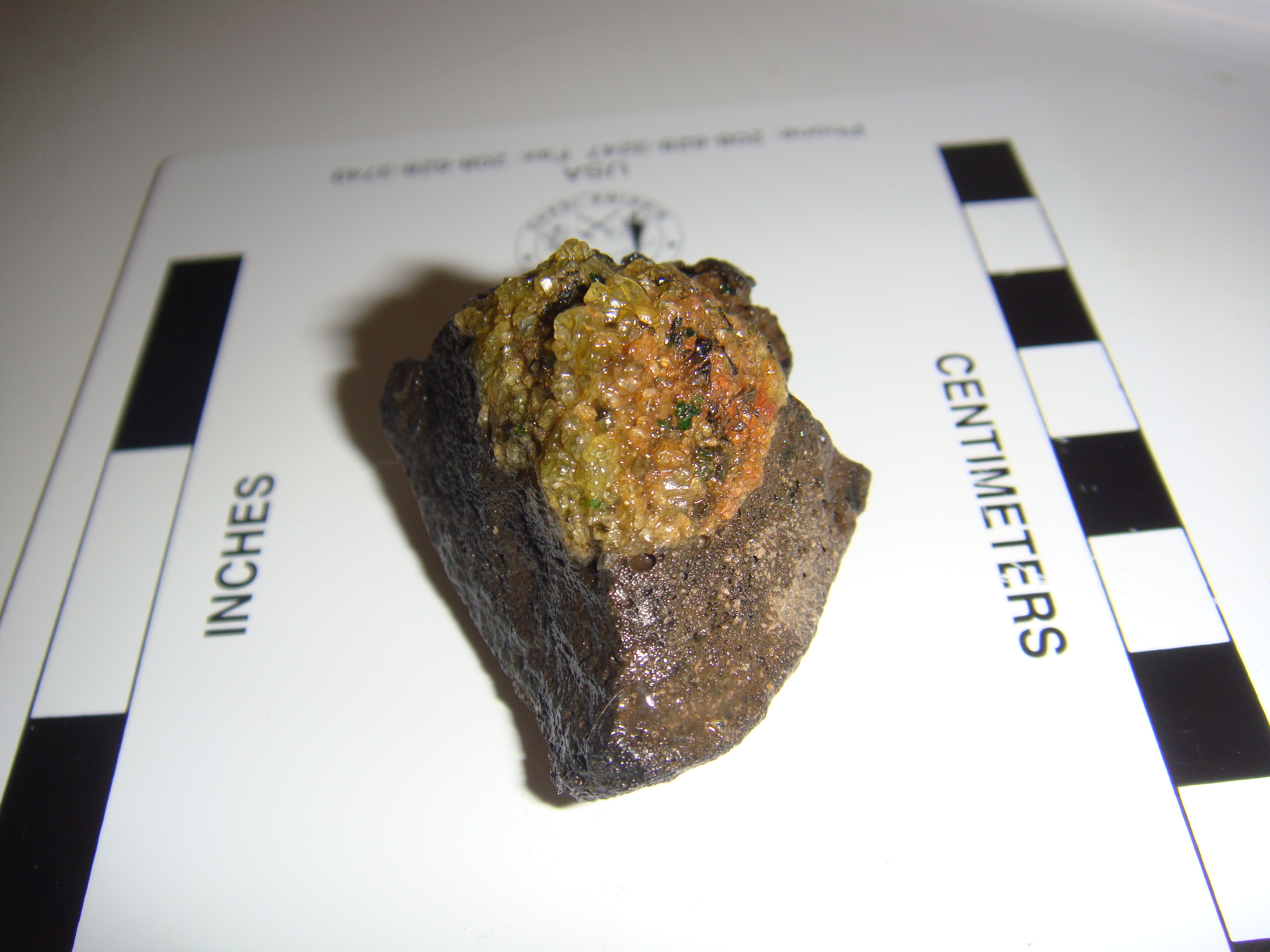
Olivine altered to iddingsite within a mantle xenolith.

Olivine is one of the less stable common minerals on the surface according to the Goldich dissolution series. It alters into iddingsite (a combination of clay minerals, iron oxides and ferrihydrite) readily in the presence of water. Artificially increasing the weathering rate of olivine, e.g. by dispersing fine-grained olivine on beaches, has been proposed as a cheap way to sequester CO_{2}. The presence of iddingsite on Mars would suggest that liquid water once existed there, and might enable scientists to determine when there was last liquid water on the planet.

Because of its rapid weathering, olivine is rarely found in sedimentary rock.

== Mining ==
=== Norway ===
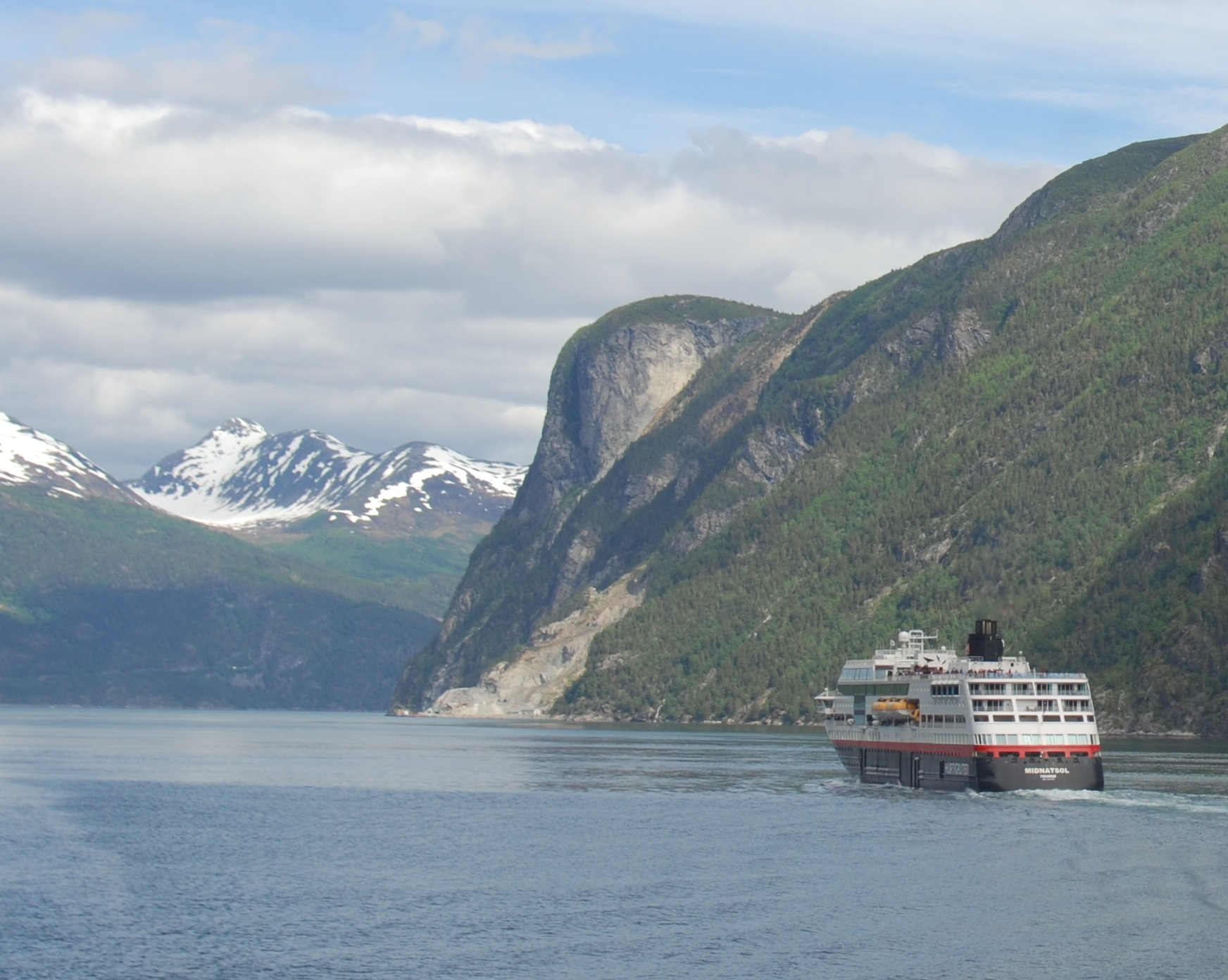
Open-pit mining at Sunnylvsfjorden, Hurtigruten ship passing.

Norway is the main source of olivine in Europe, particularly in an area stretching from Åheim to Tafjord, and from Hornindal to Flemsøy in the Sunnmøre district. There is also olivine in Stad Municipality. About 50% of the world's olivine for industrial use is produced in Norway. At Svarthammaren in Norddal Municipality (now Fjord Municipality), olivine was mined from around 1920 to 1979, with a daily output up to 600 metric tons (590 long tons; 660 short tons). Olivine was also obtained from the construction site of the hydro power stations in Tafjord. At Robbervika in Norddal municipality an open-pit mine has been in operation since 1984. The characteristic red color is reflected in several local names with "red" such as Raudbergvik (Red rock bay) or Raudnakken (Red ridge).

Hans Strøm in 1766 described the olivine's typical red color on the surface and the blue color within. Strøm wrote that in Norddal district large quantities of olivine were broken from the bedrock and used as sharpening stones.

Kallskaret near Tafjord is a nature reserve with olivine.

== Applications ==
Olivine is used as a substitute for dolomite in steel works.

The aluminium foundry industry uses olivine sand to cast objects in aluminium. Olivine sand requires less water than silica sands while still holding the mold together during handling and pouring of the metal. Less water means less gas (steam) to vent from the mold as metal is poured into the mold.

In Finland, olivine is marketed as an ideal rock for sauna stoves because of its comparatively high density and resistance to weathering under repeated heating and cooling.

Gem-quality olivine is used as a gemstone called peridot.

== Experimental uses ==
Removal of atmospheric CO_{2} via reaction with crushed olivine has been considered. The end-products of the very slow reaction are silicon dioxide, magnesium carbonate, and iron oxides. A public-benefit corporation, Project Vesta, is investigating this approach on beaches which increase the agitation and surface area of crushed olivine through wave action.

Another experimental use for olivine is in making carbon-neutral or carbon-negative cement.

== See also ==
- Bowen's reaction series – Order of crystallization of minerals in magma
- List of minerals
