= Endmember =

Mineral at the end of a mineral series

An endmember (also end-member or end member) in mineralogy is a mineral that is at the extreme end of a mineral series in terms of purity of its chemical composition. Minerals often can be described as solid solutions with varying compositions of some chemical elements, rather than as substances with an exact chemical formula. There may be two or more endmembers in a group or series of minerals.

For example, forsterite (Mg_{2}SiO_{4}) and fayalite (Fe_{2}SiO_{4}) are the two end-members of the olivine solid-solution series, varying in Mg^{2+} and Fe^{2+} in their chemical composition. So, the chemical formula of olivine can be better expressed as Mg_{(2−x)}Fe_{x}SiO_{4} or Mg_{x}Fe_{(2−x)}SiO_{4}.

As another example, the tectosilicate feldspar can be described as a solid solution of the endmembers K-feldspar (KAlSi_{3}O_{8}), albite (NaAlSi_{3}O_{8}) and anorthite (CaAl_{2}Si_{2}O_{8}). A specific feldspar can have varying quantities of potassium (K), sodium (Na) and calcium (Ca).

== See also ==
- Larvikite
