= Humite =

Nesosilicate mineral

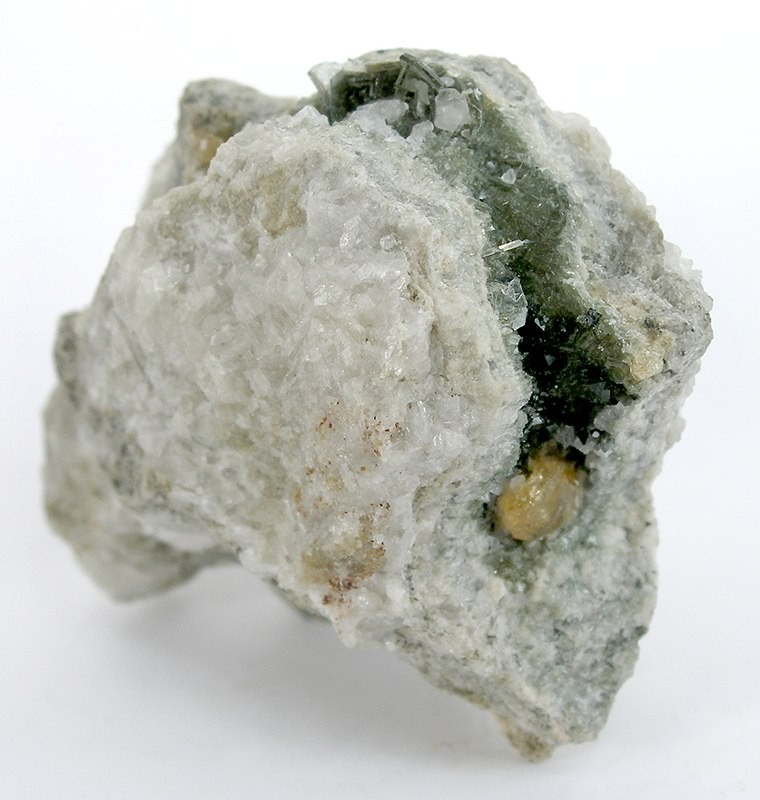
- Humite specimen, Italy

General
- Category: Nesosilicates
- Formula: (Mg,Fe)_{7}(SiO_{4})_{3}(F,OH)_{2}.
- IMA symbol: Hu
- Strunz classification: 9.AF.50
- Crystal system: Orthorhombic
- Crystal class: Dipyramidal (mmm); H–M Symbol: (2/m 2/m 2/m)
- Space group: Pbnm
- Unit cell: a = 10.24, b = 20.72 c = 4.73 [Å]; Z = 4

Identification
- Color: White, yellow, dark orange, brown
- Cleavage: Poor
- Fracture: Uneven to subconchoidal
- Tenacity: Brittle
- Mohs scale hardness: 6–6.5
- Luster: Vitreous
- Streak: White
- Diaphaneity: Transparent
- Specific gravity: 3.20 – 3.32
- Optical properties: Biaxial (+)
- Refractive index: n_{α} =1.607–1.643, n_{β}=1.619–1.653, n_{γ}=1.639–1.675
- Birefringence: 0.0320
- 2V angle: Calculated = 70–78°, measured = 68–81°
- Dispersion: Weak, r > v

Humite is a mineral found in the volcanically ejected masses of Vesuvius. It was first described in 1813 and named for Abraham Hume (1749–1838).

== See also ==
- Alleghanyite
- Chondrodite
- Clinohumite
- Jerrygibbsite
