= Ludwigite =

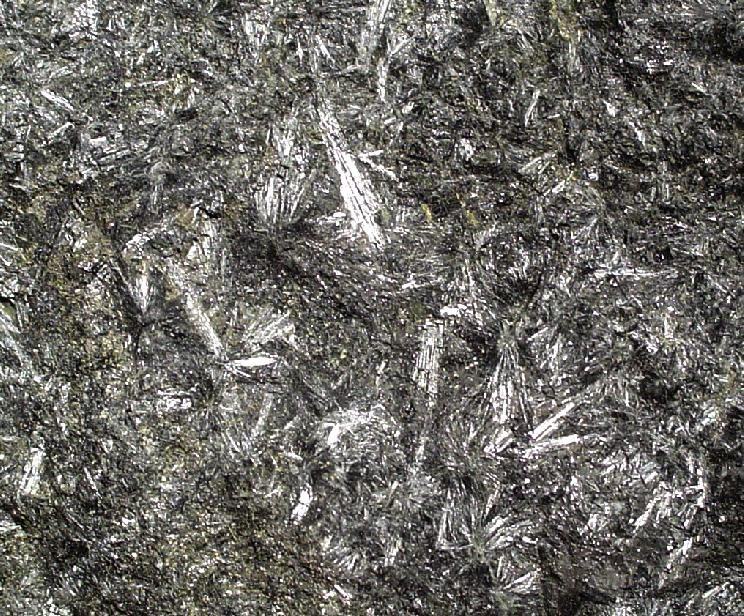
- Radial aggregates of lustrous, black, metallic, acicular ludwigite crystals to 0.5 cm, from Alta Stock, Salt Lake County, Utah, USA.

General
- Category: Borate mineral
- Formula: Mg_{2}Fe^{3+}BO_{5}
- IMA symbol: Ldw
- Strunz classification: 6.AB.30
- Crystal system: Orthorhombic
- Crystal class: Dipyramidal (mmm); H-M symbol: (2/m 2/m 2/m)
- Space group: Pbam
- Unit cell: a = 9.24, b = 12.29 c = 3.02 [Å]; Z = 4

Identification
- Formula mass: 195.26 g/mol
- Color: Pitch-black, olive-black
- Crystal habit: Massive – fibrous commonly in fanlike to felted aggregates
- Cleavage: [001] Perfect
- Fracture: Brittle – Conchoidal – Very brittle fracture producing small, conchoidal fragments.
- Mohs scale hardness: 5.5
- Luster: Silky to submetallic
- Streak: Greenish black
- Diaphaneity: Opaque, translucent in thin fragments
- Specific gravity: 3.6 – 3.8
- Optical properties: Biaxial (+)
- Refractive index: n_{α} = 1.830 – 1.850 n_{β} = 1.830 – 1.850 n_{γ} = 1.940 – 2.020
- Birefringence: δ = 0.110 – 0.170
- Pleochroism: X = Y = dark green; Z = dark reddish brown
- 2V angle: Measured: 20° to 45°
- Solubility: Slowly soluble in acid
- Alters to: limonite

Ludwigite is a metamorphic anhydrous monoborate with the chemical composition Mg_{2}Fe^{3+}(BO_{3})O_{2}. It is classified as a magnesium-iron borate mineral.

== Name and classification ==
Ludwigite was named after Austrian chemist Ernst Ludwig, who initially discovered the mineral in 1874 in Ocna de Fier, Caraș-Severin County, Romania. Ludwigite was also known by its alternate name, magnesioludwigite, to distinguish it from prospective ludwigite samples with high iron content. In 1917, Butler and Schaller described a previously investigated iron-rich sample of ludwigite to be renamed as ferroludwigite and creating a group of minerals known as the ludwigite group, including pinakiolite. In 1920, the term "ferroludwigite" was associated with a different mineral, vonsenite.

Another name for ludwigite is collbranite, listed as a different mineral prior to 1921. Samples of collbranite were tested to confirm its distinct structure amidst conflicting descriptions of the mineral, but it was concluded that collbranite was ludwigite.

== Chemistry ==
Ludwigite typically occurs in magnesian iron skarn and other high temperature contact metamorphic deposits. It occurs in association with magnetite, forsterite, clinohumite, the borates vonsenite and szaibelyite, and as inclusions in the gemstone peridot. It forms a solid solution series with the iron(II)-iron(III) borate mineral vonsenite. Samples of ludwigite can have trace amounts of other metals within its structure as a substitution for magnesium and iron, such as aluminium, manganese, tin and titanium. The metal ions within ludwigite are bonded octahedrally to oxygen, sharing a "wall" in a cluster of two octahedra.

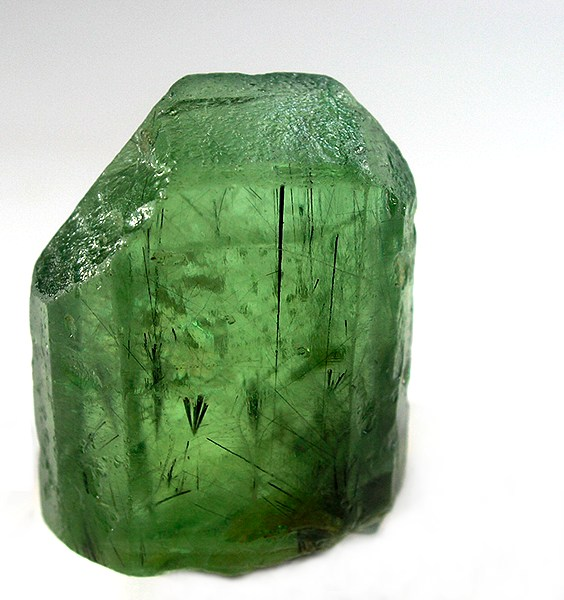
Ludwigite needles and sprays as inclusions in a peridot crystal from Sapat Gali, Kohistan District, Pakistan. Size 2.8 x 2 x 1.1 cm.
