= Glaucochroite =

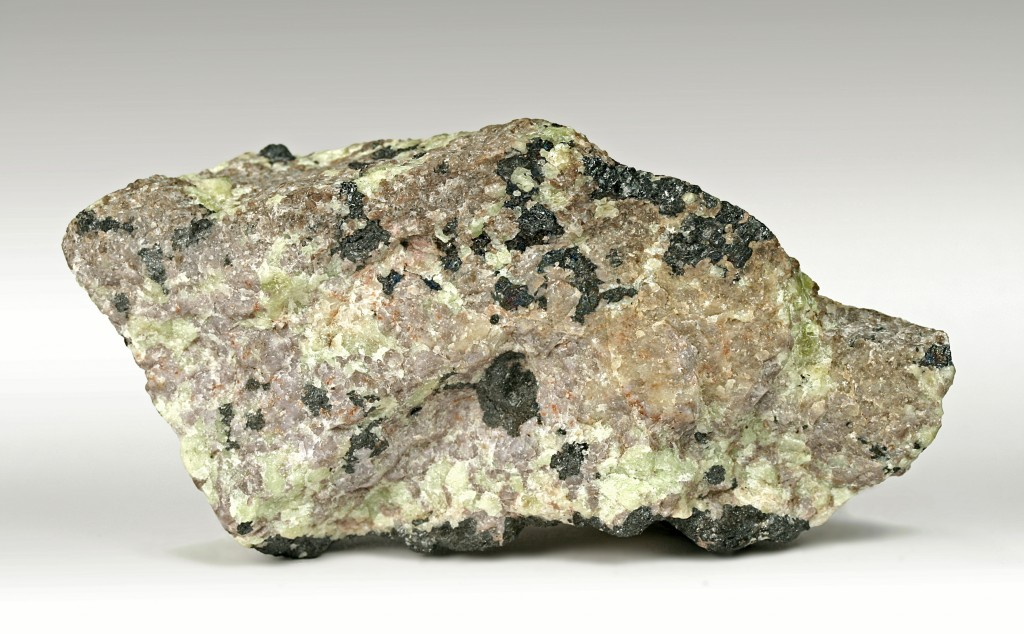
- Glaucochroite found in New Jersey

General
- Category: Silicate mineral
- Formula: CaMnSiO_{4}
- Strunz classification: 9.AC.05
- Dana classification: 51.3.2.3
- Crystal system: Orthorhombic

Identification
- Color: Bluish-gray, pink, brown, or white
- Fracture: Conchoidal, sub-conchoidal
- Mohs scale hardness: 6
- Luster: Vitreous, sub-vitreous, resinous
- Streak: white
- Optical properties: Biaxial (−)

Glaucochroite is a calcium manganese nesosilicate mineral with formula CaMnSiO_{4}. It occurs in metamorphosed limestones.

It was first described in 1899 in Franklin Furnace, Sussex County, New Jersey.
