= Monticellite =

Monticellite-Kirschsteinite
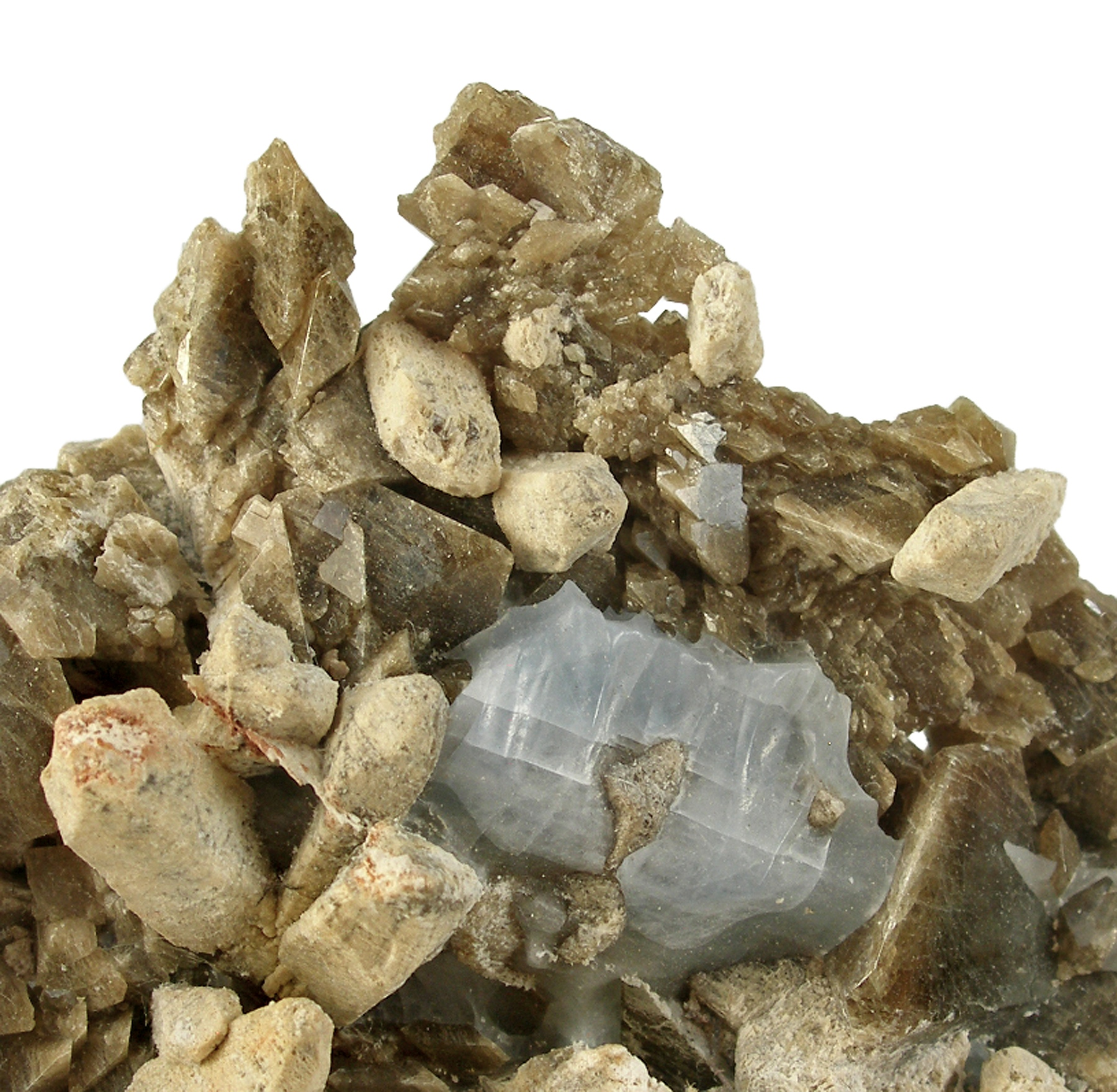
- Sharp, freestanding monticellite crystals to over 1 cm, perched on semilustrous brown vesuvianite (idocrase) crystals. Remnant calcite matrix is blue-gray.

General
- Category: Nesosilicate
- Formula: Ca(Mg,Fe)SiO_{4}
- IMA symbol: Mtc – Kir
- Strunz classification: 9.AC.10
- Crystal system: Orthorhombic
- Crystal class: Dipyramidal (mmm); H-M symbol: (2/m 2/m 2/m)
- Space group: Pbnm

Identification
- Colour: colourless or grey
- Cleavage: {010}
- Mohs scale hardness: 5.5
- Specific gravity: 3.05 – 3.27
- Refractive index: α = 1.638 – 1.654, β = 1.646 – 1.664, γ = 1.650 – 1.674
- Melting point: 1503 °C

Monticellite and kirschsteinite (commonly also spelled kirschteinite) are gray silicate minerals of the olivine group with compositions CaMgSiO_{4} and CaFeSiO_{4}, respectively. Most monticellites have the pure magnesium end-member composition but rare ferroan monticellites and magnesio-kirschsteinite are found with between 30 and 75 mol.% of the iron end member. Pure kirschsteinite is only found in synthetic systems. Monticellite is named after Teodoro Monticelli, an Italian mineralogist (1759–1845). Kirschsteinite is named after Egon Kirschstein, a German geologist.

Like other members of the group monticellite and kirschsteinite have orthorhombic unit cells (space group Pbnm) shown in Figure 1. Iron and magnesium ions are located on the M1 inversion sites and calcium ions occupy the M2 site on mirror planes. The unit cell is somewhat larger than for the calcium free olivines forsterite and fayalite with

a = 0.4815 nm,
b = 1.108 nm and
c = 0.637 nm,

and for monticellite

a = 0.4875 nm,
b = 1.1155 nm and
c = 0.6438 nm.

== Gallery ==
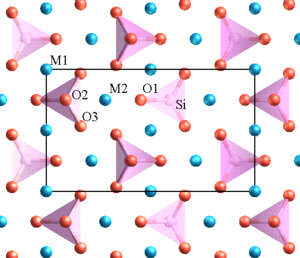
The atomic scale structure of olivine looking along the a axis. Oxygen is shown in red, silicon in pink, and Mg, Fe and Ca in blue. A projection of the unit cell is shown by the black rectangle.

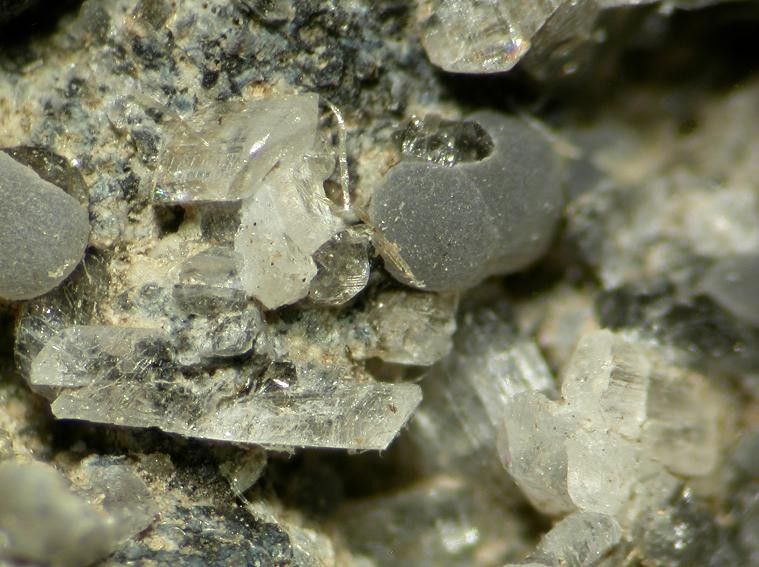
Colourless crystals of kirschsteinite
