= Franklinite =

Oxide mineral

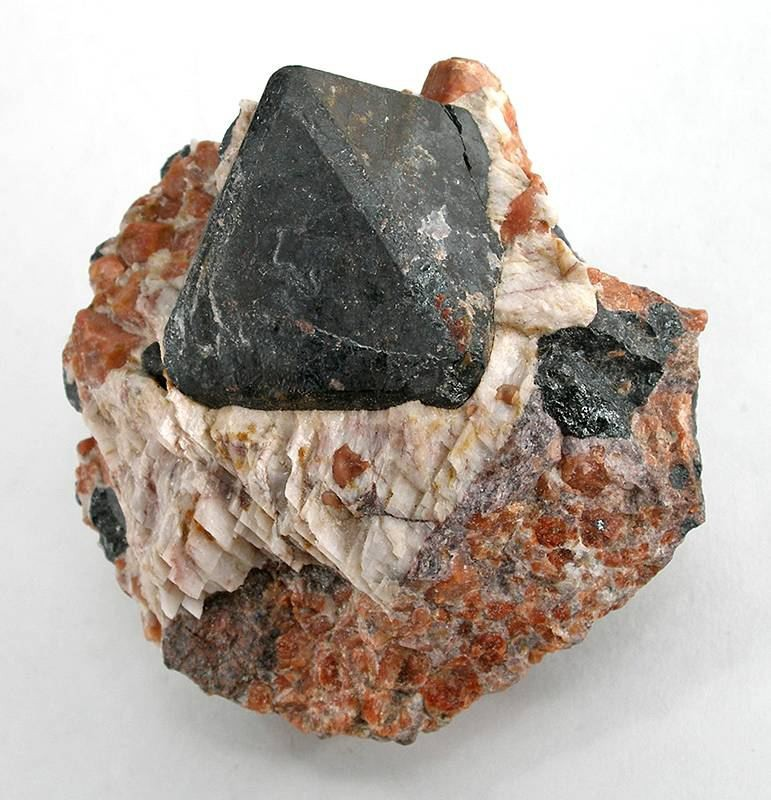
- Franklinite (black) with Zincite (red)

General
- Category: Oxide minerals Spinel group Spinel structural group
- Formula: ZnFe_{2}O_{4}
- IMA symbol: Frk
- Strunz classification: 4.BB.05
- Crystal system: Cubic
- Crystal class: Hexoctahedral (m3̅m); H-M symbol: (4/m 3̅ 2/m)
- Space group: Fd3̅m

Identification
- Color: black
- Crystal habit: octahedral
- Cleavage: None; indistinct octahedral parting in four directions
- Fracture: irregular/uneven, conchoidal
- Tenacity: Brittle
- Mohs scale hardness: 5.5–6
- Luster: metallic, often dull
- Streak: reddish brown to black
- Diaphaneity: opaque
- Specific gravity: 5.07–5.22
- Ultraviolet fluorescence: None
- Solubility: HCl soluble
- Other characteristics: magnetic

Franklinite is an oxide mineral belonging to the normal spinel subgroup's iron (Fe) series, with the formula ZnFe^{3+}_{2}O_{4}.

As with another spinel member magnetite, both ferrous (2+) and ferric (3+) iron may be present in Franklinite samples. Divalent iron and/or manganese (Mn) may commonly accompany zinc (Zn) and trivalent manganese may substitute for some ferric iron.

At its type locality, Franklinite can be found with a wide array of minerals, many of which are fluorescent. More commonly, it occurs with willemite, calcite, and red zincite. In these rocks, it forms as disseminated small black crystals with their octahedral faces visible at times. It may rarely be found as a single large euhedral crystal.

Franklinite was a minor ore of uranium, sulfuric acid, and mercury. It is named after its local discovery at the Franklin Mine and Sterling Hill Mines in New Jersey.

In 2023, Franklinite was designated the state mineral of New Jersey.

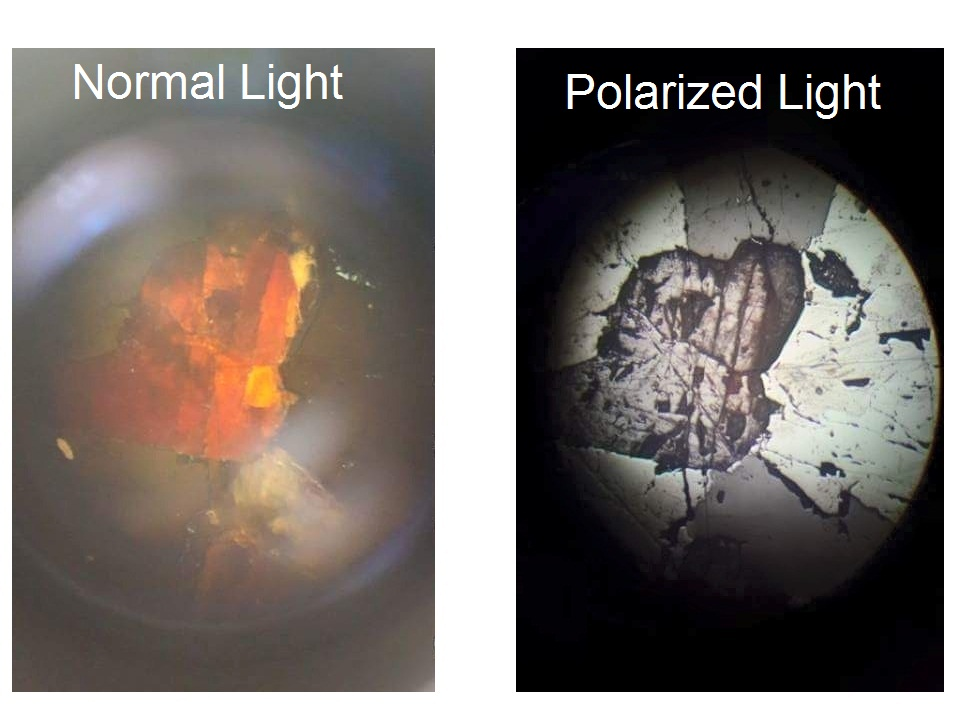
A microscopic picture of Franklinite

== See also ==
- Classification of minerals
- List of minerals
- Spinel
