= Zincite =

Mineral

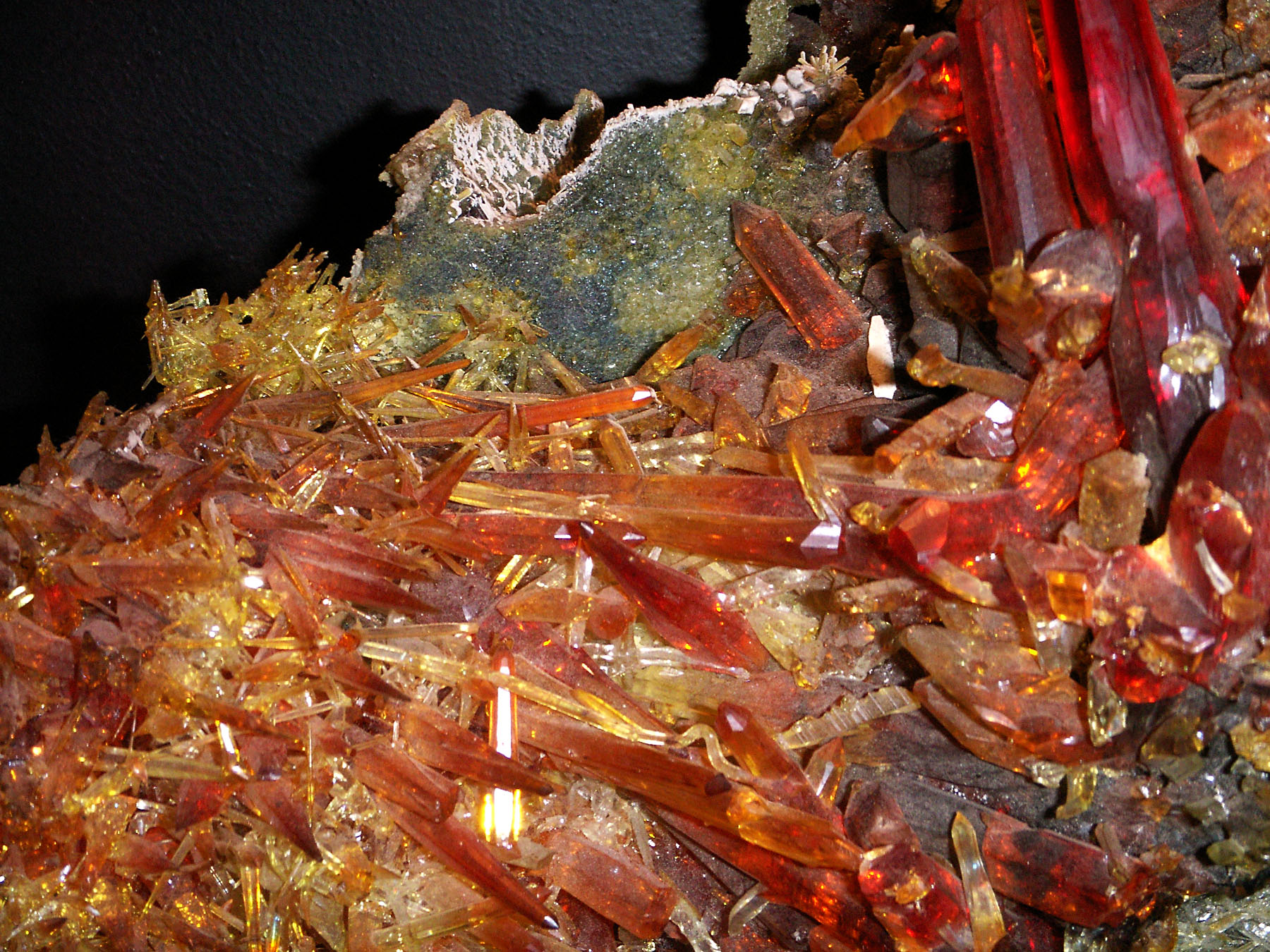
- Crystal blades of zincite

General
- Category: Oxide mineral
- Formula: (Zn,Mn)O
- IMA symbol: Znc
- Strunz classification: 4.AB.20
- Dana classification: 04.02.02.01
- Crystal system: Hexagonal
- Crystal class: Dihexagonal pyramidal (6mm); H-M symbol: (6mm)
- Space group: P6_{3}mc

Identification
- Color: Orange, yellow-orange to deep red, red, rarely yellow, rarely green and colorless to white
- Crystal habit: Disseminated – occurs in small, distinct particles dispersed in matrix.
- Twinning: On {0001}
- Cleavage: On {101̅0}, perfect; parting on {0001̅}
- Fracture: Conchoidal
- Tenacity: Brittle
- Mohs scale hardness: 4
- Luster: Subadamantine to resinous
- Streak: Yellowish orange
- Diaphaneity: Translucent, transparent in thin fragments
- Specific gravity: 5.64–5.68
- Optical properties: Uniaxial (+)
- Refractive index: n_{ω} = 2.013, n_{ε} = 2.029
- Birefringence: δ = 0.016

Zincite is the mineral form of zinc oxide (ZnO). Its crystal form is rare in nature; a notable exception to this is at the Franklin and Sterling Hill Mines in New Jersey, an area also famed for its many fluorescent minerals. It has a hexagonal crystal structure and a color that depends on the presence of impurities. The zincite found at the Franklin Furnace is red-colored, mostly due to iron and manganese dopants, and associated with willemite and franklinite.

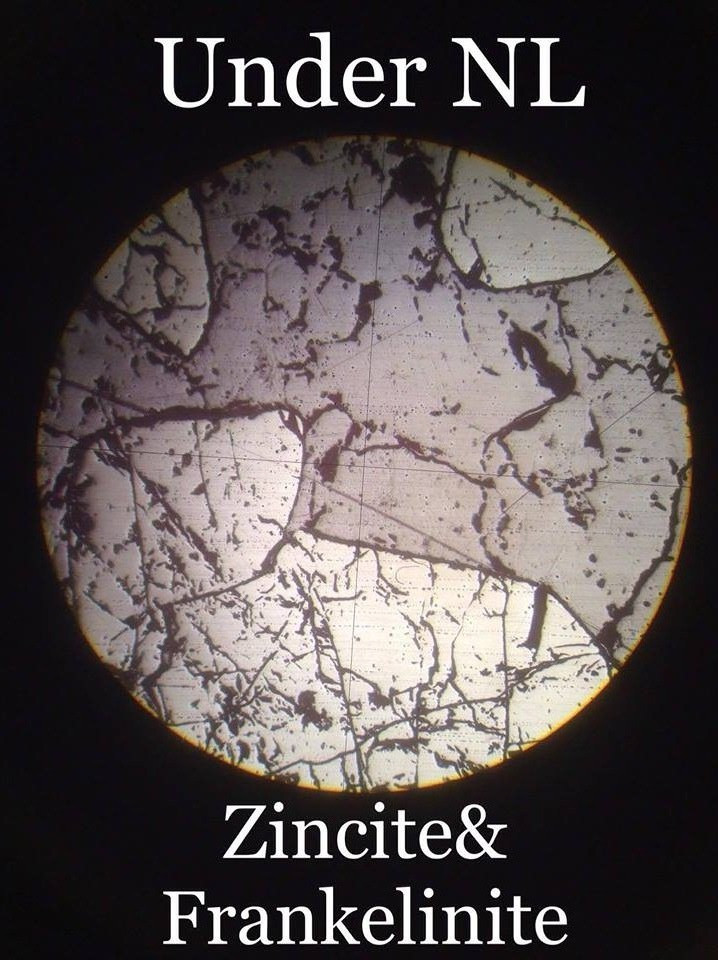
Microscopic image of Zincite and Franklinite under normal light

Zincite crystals can be grown artificially, and synthetic zincite crystals are available as a by-product of zinc smelting. Synthetic crystals can be colorless or can range in color from dark red, orange, or yellow to light green.

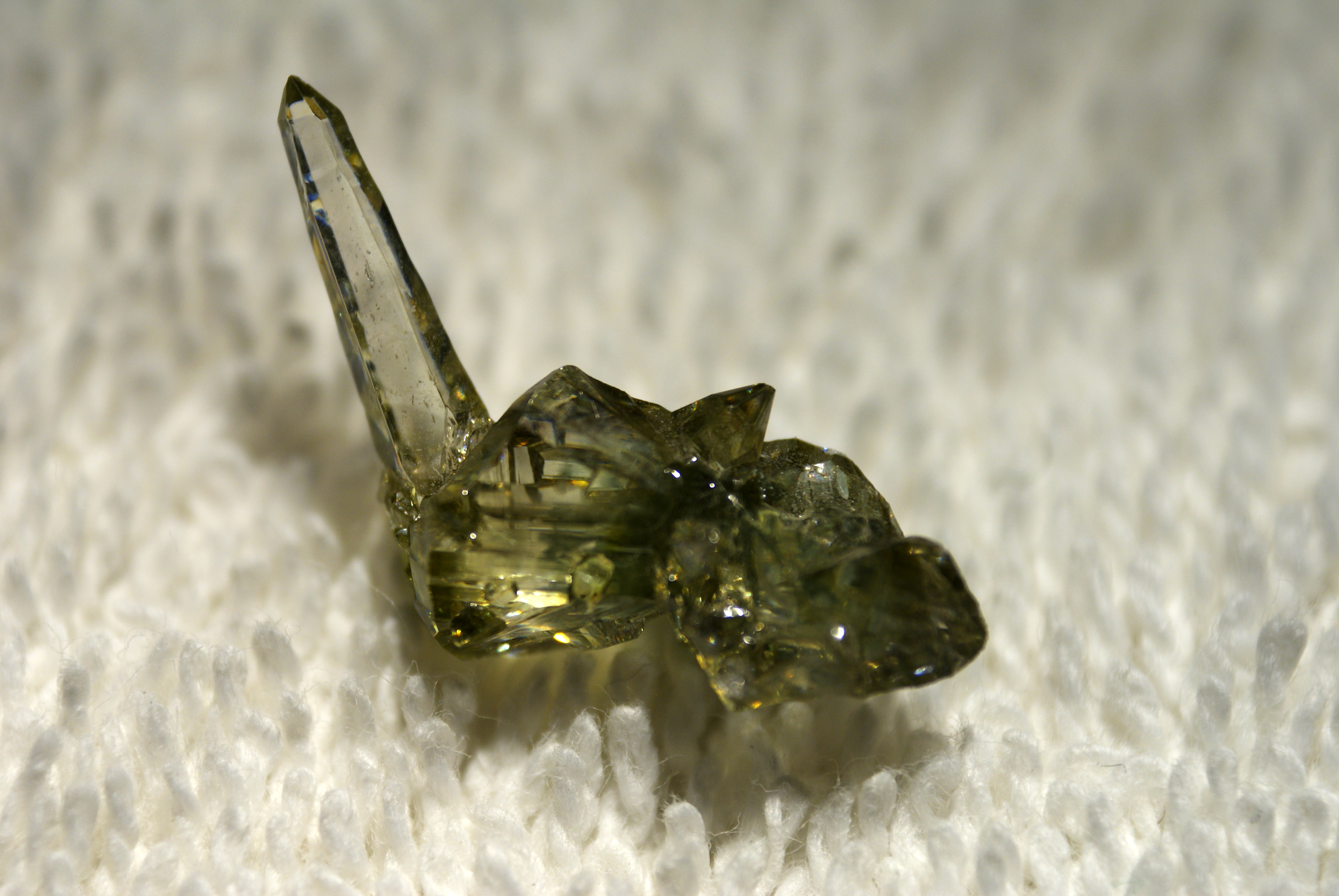
Synthetic zincite crystals

Both natural and synthetic zincite crystals are significant for their early use as semiconductor crystal detectors in the early development of crystal radios before the advent of vacuum tubes. As an early radio detector it was used in conjunction with another mineral, galena, and this device was known as the cat's-whisker detector.

== See also ==
- List of minerals
- Oleg Losev
