= Willemite =

Nesosilicate mineral

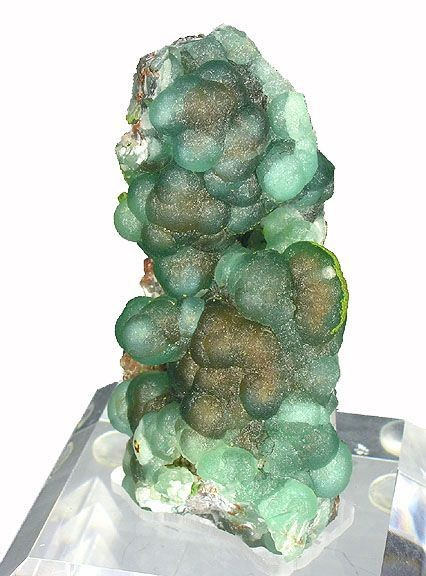
- Willemite from Namibia

General
- Category: Silicate mineral
- Formula: Zn_{2}SiO_{4}
- IMA symbol: Wlm
- Strunz classification: 9.AA.05 (10 ed); 8/A.01-20 (8 ed)
- Dana classification: 51.1.1.2
- Crystal system: Trigonal
- Crystal class: Rhombohedral (3̅) (same H-M symbol)
- Space group: R3̅

Identification
- Color: Colorless to white, gray, black, flesh-red, burgundy-red, pink, brown, dark brown, mahogany-brown, honey-yellow, yellow, apple-green, blue, pastel green, light blue, azure-blue
- Crystal habit: Fibrous, botryoidal to massive
- Cleavage: {0001}, {112̅0} – imperfect
- Fracture: Irregular to conchoidal
- Mohs scale hardness: 5.5
- Luster: Vitreous to resinous
- Diaphaneity: Transparent to opaque
- Specific gravity: 3.9 – 4.2
- Optical properties: Uniaxial (+)
- Refractive index: nω = 1.691 – 1.694 nε = 1.719 – 1.725
- Birefringence: δ = 0.028
- Other characteristics: Strongly fluorescent; may be phosphorescent

Major varieties
- troostite: zinc is partly replaced by manganese

Willemite is a zinc silicate mineral (Zn_{2}SiO_{4}) and a minor ore of zinc. It is highly fluorescent (green) under shortwave ultraviolet light. It occurs in a variety of colors in daylight, in fibrous masses and apple-green gemmy masses. Troostite is a variant in which part of the zinc is partly replaced by manganese, it occurs in solid brown masses.

It was discovered in 1829 in the Belgian Vieille-Montagne mine. Armand Lévy was shown samples by a student at the university where he was teaching. Lévy named it after William I of the Netherlands (it is occasionally spelled villemite). The troostite variety is named after Dutch-American mineralogist Gerard Troost.

== Occurrence ==
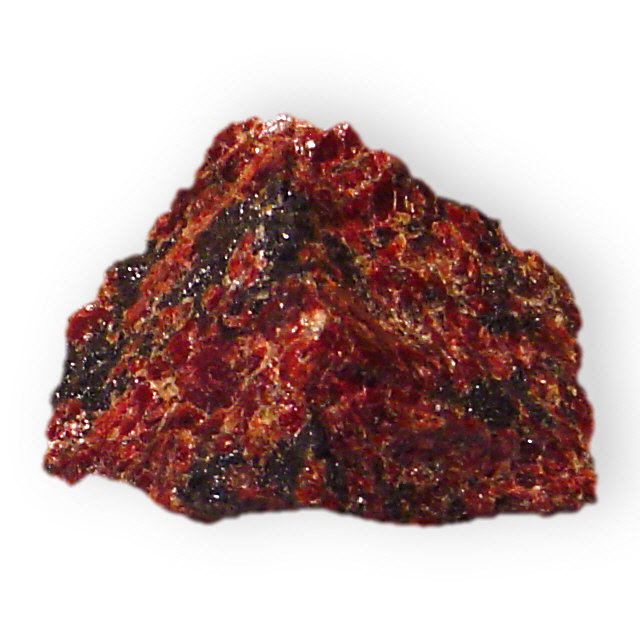
Willemite variety troostite from New Jersey

Willemite is usually formed as an alteration of previously existing sphalerite ore bodies, and is usually associated with limestone. It is also found in marble and may be the result of a metamorphism of earlier hemimorphite or smithsonite. Crystals have the form of hexagonal prisms terminated by rhombohedral planes: there are distinct cleavages parallel to the prism-faces and to the base. Granular and cleavage masses are of more common occurrence. It occurs in many places, but is best known from Arizona and the zinc, iron, manganese deposits at Franklin and Sterling Hill Mines in New Jersey. It often occurs with red zincite (zinc oxide) and franklinite (Fe,Mn,Zn)(Fe,Mn)_{2}O_{4} (an iron rich zinc mineral occurring in sharp black isometric octahedral crystals and masses). Franklinite and zincite are not fluorescent.

== Uses ==
Artificial willemite was used as the basis of first-generation fluorescent tube phosphors. When doped with manganese ions, it fluoresces with a broad white emission band. Some versions had some of the zinc replaced with beryllium. In the 1940s it was largely replaced by second-generation halophosphors based on fluorapatite. These, in turn have been replaced by the third-generation TriPhosphors.

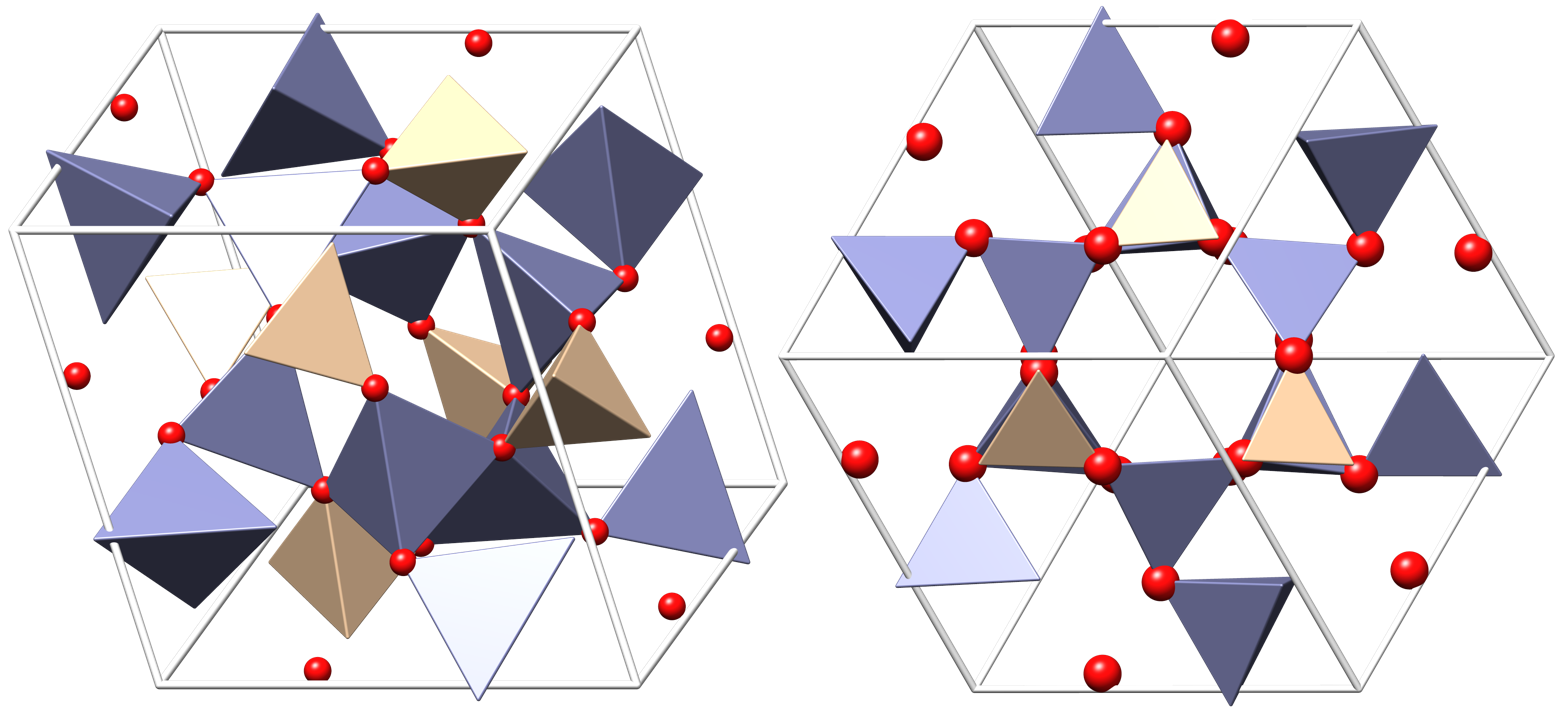
Crystal structure of willemite

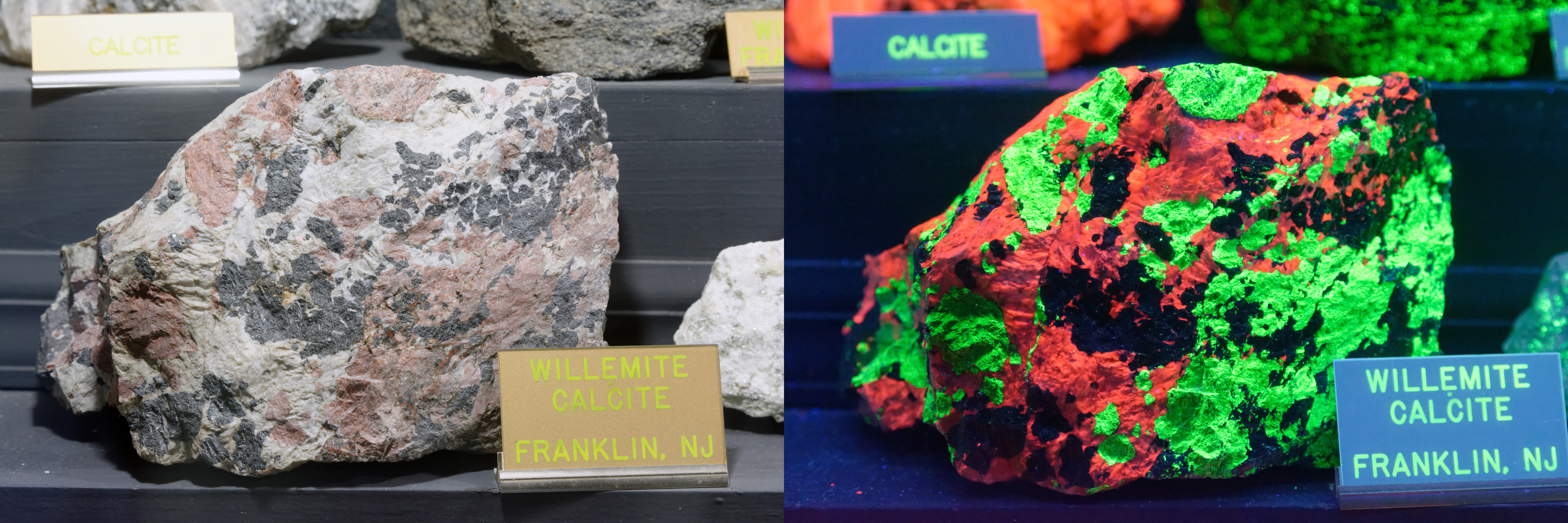
In natural and in ultraviolet light

== See also ==
- List of minerals
- List of minerals named after people
