= Ganophyllite =

Phyllosilicate mineral

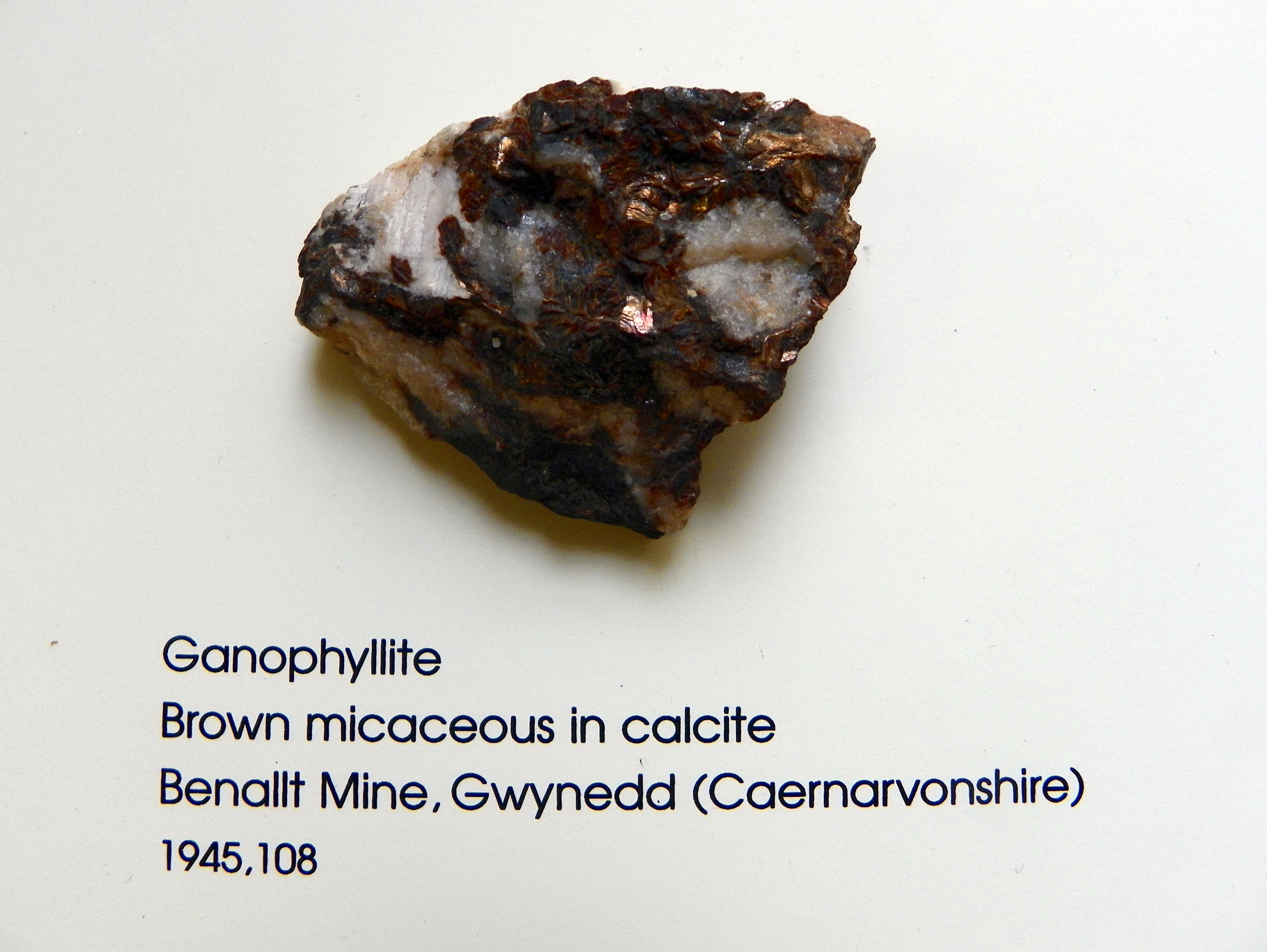

General
- Category: Phyllosilicate minerals
- Formula: (K,Na,Ca)_{2}Mn_{8}(Si,Al)_{12}(O,OH)_{32} · 8H_{2}O
- IMA symbol: Gnp
- Strunz classification: 09.EG.30
- Dana classification: 74.01.02.01
- Crystal system: Monoclinic
- Crystal class: Prismatic (2/m)
- Space group: A2/a
- Unit cell: 22,545.01

Identification
- Formula mass: 1,514.2
- Color: Brownish yellow to cinnamon brown
- Crystal habit: Foliated micaceous
- Cleavage: Perfect on {???}
- Fracture: Brittle
- Mohs scale hardness: 4 - 4.5
- Luster: Vitreous
- Streak: Brownish yellow
- Diaphaneity: Transparent to transculent
- Specific gravity: 2.84
- Density: 2.84
- Optical properties: Biaxial(-)
- Refractive index: n_{α} = 1.537 n_{β} = 1.611 n_{γ}= 1.613
- Birefringence: 0.076
- Pleochroism: X = Pale yellow brown Y = Z = Dark yellow brown
- Dispersion: Weak
- Ultraviolet fluorescence: None
- Common impurities: Fe, Zn, Pb, Ca, Ba
- Other characteristics: Radioactive 3.87% (K)

Ganophyllite is a phyllosilicate mineral. It was named by Axel Hamberg in 1890 from the Greek words for leaf (φύλλον) and luster (γανωμα); the latter one was chosen due to the lustrous cleavages. The mineral was approved by the IMA in 1959, and it is a grandfathered mineral, meaning its name is still believed to refer to an existing species until this day. Tamaite is the calcium analogue, while eggletonite is the natrium analogue of said mineral.

== Properties ==
Ganophyllite is a member of the ganophyllite group, among with eggletonite and tamaite, and it is the potassium variety of eggletonite. Common impurities of the mineral include lead, iron, calcium, barium, and zinc. The zinc impurities can be explained with the fact the mineral usually grows in zinc-manganese mines. The formula of ganophyllite includes potassium (K), while eggletonite includes sodium (Na) and tamaite includes calcium (Ca). It has a barely detectable potassium radioactivity and a barely detectable 1.8% radiation measured by GRapi (Gamma Ray American Petroleum Institute Units). It mostly consists of oxygen (47.02%), manganese (21.77%) and silicon (16.69%), but otherwise contains aluminium (5.88%), potassium (3.87%), which gives ganophyllite its radioactive attributes, magnesium (2.41%), hydrogen (1.6%) and sodium (0.76%). Ganophyllite is pleochroic, which means the mineral's color seems as though it changes depending on the axis it is inspected on: on the X axis, it is seen in a pale yellow-brown color, and on the Y and Z axis, it can be seen as a dark yellow-brown gem. The mineral has a foliated crystal habit - it forms platy, thin sheets that part, and are layered on top of one another.

== Distribution ==
Ganophyllite occurs in metamorphosed manganese deposits, especially in zinc-manganese ones. It is a type locality of the Harstigen mine in Sweden, although the first specimen was found at the Nant mine in Wales, however, it can also be found in the Benallt mine as well. Other places where it has been found include Molinello and Gambatesa mines in Italy, Maple-Hovey deposits in Franklin, New Jersey and at Mont Saint-Hilaire in Canada. Asian mines include the Kumahata mine, the Noda-Tamagawa mine, the Ananai mine, and the Osu and Yonoyama mines, all in Japan. Ganophyllite can be found at the Broken hill in Australia as well.

== Associated minerals ==
Ganophyllite has a lot of minerals associated with it, although most of it is mine specific. In each mine, the minerals associated with ganophyllite may vary.

In the Harstigen mine, the associated minerals are the followings: pyrophanite, caryopilite, calcite, garnet, rhodonite, barite, lead, and manganoan biotite.

Ganophyllites from the Molinello mine have the following associated minerals: caryopilite and parsettensite.

The following associated minerals can occur with specimens from Franklin: axinite, rhodonite, datolite, willemite, bustamite, charlesite, clinohedrite and roeblingite.
