= Hendricksite =

Mineral in the trioctahedral mica group

General
- Category: Phyllosilicate minerals
- Group: Mica group, trioctahedral mica group
- Formula: KZn_{3}(Si_{3}Al)O_{10}(OH)_{2}
- IMA symbol: Hds
- Strunz classification: 09.EC.20
- Dana classification: 71.2.2b.6
- Crystal system: Monoclinic
- Crystal class: Prismatic (2/m)
- Space group: B2/m
- Unit cell: 499.58

Identification
- Formula mass: 493.25
- Color: Copper-, bronze brown, dark reddish brown to reddish black
- Cleavage: Perfect on {001}
- Mohs scale hardness: 2.5 – 3
- Streak: Red brown
- Diaphaneity: Translucent
- Specific gravity: 2.86 - 3.43
- Optical properties: Biaxial (−)
- Refractive index: n_{α} = 1.598 – 1.624 n_{β} = 1.658 – 1.686 n_{γ} = 1.660 – 1.697
- Birefringence: 0.062 – 0.073
- Pleochroism: X = Pale yellow, Y = Z = Light chestnut brown
- 2V angle: Measured: 2°- 8° Calculated: 20°- 44°
- Dispersion: Slight r < v
- Ultraviolet fluorescence: None
- Common impurities: Ti, Fe, Ca, Ba, Li, Na, F

Hendricksite is a member of the trioctahedral micas group. The mineral was named by Clifford Frondel and Jun Ito in honor of Sterling Brown Hendricks, who studied micas. It was approved in 1966 by the IMA.

== Physical properties ==
Hendricksite can either form short prismatic crystals, or foliated ones that are platy and seem two dimensional. It occurs in clusters, and these aggregates have interlocking crystals. These crystals are more commonly anhedral – a crystal with no faces, but rarely they can be euhedral – crystals with well defined surfaces. The anhedral crystals can grow up to 30 cm, and are commonly deformed, while the euhedral crystals can reach 14 cms in size of mechanical deformation. It has pleochroic attributes, which is an optical phenomenon that makes minerals to be seen a different color depending on the axis it is inspected on. On the X axis, it can be seen in a pale brown color, while on the Y and Z axis it is seen in a light chestnut brown color. It doesn't show any fluorescence under either shortwave, or longwave ultraviolet light.

== Chemical properties ==
It mostly consists of oxygen (38.92%), zinc (18.56%), silicon (15.37%) and manganese (10.02%), but otherwise contains potassium (7.13%), aluminium (7.11%), magnesium (2.46%) and a negligible amount of hydrogen (0.41%). It has a barely detectable, 1% radioactivity measured by GRapi (Gamma Ray American Petroleum Institute Units) due to its potassium content, which gives the mineral its radioactive attributes. Zinc in hendricksite's formula can be replaced with manganese(II) or magnesium. Currently, this is the only mica known for its zinc dominancy, and it is the zinc analogue of phlogopite, annite, and shirozulite. It can have calcium, iron, titanium, barium, lithium, natrium and fluorine impurities. It has three known polytypes, which include 1M, 2M_{1}, and 3A. Hendricksite can be included in a solid solution series with zincohendricksite and manganoanhendricksite being the endmembers, a solid solution series meaning the three sharing a general formula but having a substitution of elements in at least one of the atomic sites. A part of the solid solutions series might be magnesium bearing hendricksite, the series perhaps being complete to phlogopite and partially to biotite. In the case of trioctahedral micas, the ellipsoids of the cationic sites have an uniaxial positive optical property, elongated to c. However, in hendricksite's case this is only typical for the two zinc-free sides. In the octahedras containing zinc, the ellipsoids are uniaxial negative and flattened to a.

== Occurrences and localities ==
It can appear only in metamorphosed stratiform zinc deposits, in irregular lens or sheet like skarn bodies. It can be found in the Franklin mine in New Jersey, US. The mineral can be found at the Sterling hill as well, although it is much rarer due to the higher iron and magnesium concentrations. It occurs with vesuvianite, bustamite and feldspars, additional associated minerals being minerals of the axinite group, calcite, rhodonite, willemite, hancockite, as well as andrasite.
