= Pyrophanite =

Manganese titanium oxide mineral

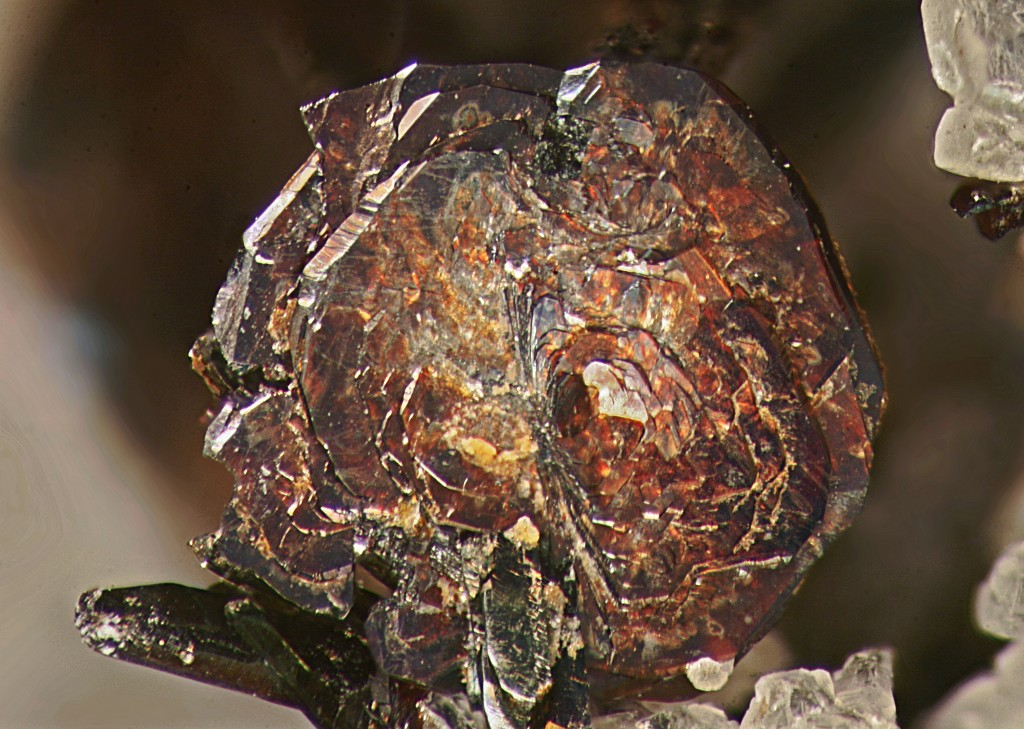

General
- Category: Oxide mineral
- Formula: MnTiO_{3}
- IMA symbol: Pph
- Strunz classification: 4.CB.05
- Dana classification: 4.3.5.3
- Crystal system: Trigonal
- Crystal class: Rhombohedral (3̅) (same H-M symbol)
- Space group: R3̅
- Unit cell: a = 5.13948(7) Å, c = 14.2829(4) Å; Z = 6

Identification
- Color: Deep blood-red to greenish black
- Crystal habit: Rarely as rosettes of hexagonal plates, typically granular, scaly; occurs as exsolution lamenae in franklinite and spinel
- Cleavage: Perfect on {0221}
- Fracture: Conchoidal
- Tenacity: Brittle
- Mohs scale hardness: 5–6
- Luster: Submetallic
- Streak: Ochre yellow
- Diaphaneity: Subtranslucent to opaque
- Specific gravity: 4.537 measured
- Optical properties: Uniaxial (-)
- Refractive index: n_{ω} = 2.481 n_{ε} = 2.210
- Birefringence: δ = 0.271
- Common impurities: Fe, Zn

Pyrophanite is a manganese titanium oxide mineral with formula: MnTiO_{3}. It is a member of the ilmenite group. It is a deep red to greenish black mineral which crystallizes in the trigonal system.

== Discovery and occurrence ==
It was first described in 1890 from an occurrence in the Harstigen Mine, Filipstad, Värmland, Sweden. Its name was derived from the Greek πΰρ, fire, and φαίνεσθαι, to appear, because of the deep red color of the mineral.

Its main occurrence is in manganese deposits that have undergone metamorphism. It also occurs in granite, amphibolite and serpentinite as an uncommon accessory mineral. Associated minerals include ilmenite, geikielite, hematite, spinel, gahnite, chromite, magnetite, ganophyllite, manganophyllite, hendricksite, garnet and calcite.
