= Johnbaumite =

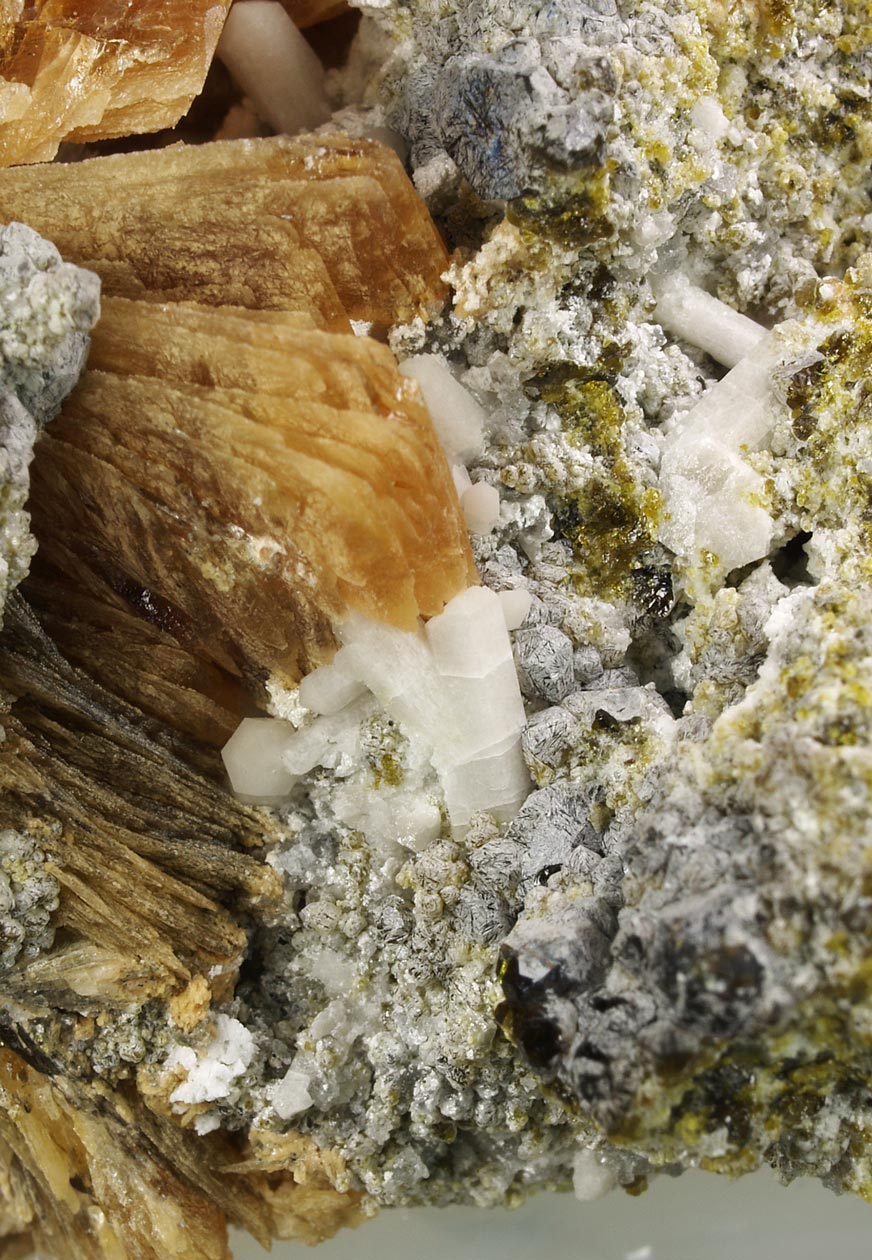

General
- Category: Apatite group
- Formula: Ca_{5}(AsO_{4})_{3}OH
- IMA symbol: Jbm
- Strunz classification: 08.BN.05
- Dana classification: 41.08.03.03
- Crystal system: Hexagonal
- Crystal class: Dipyramidal (8/m)
- Space group: P6_{3}/m

Identification
- Colour: Greyish white to colourless
- Crystal habit: Anhedral grains, granular minerals without the expression of crystal shapes and massive, uniformly indistinguishable crystals forming large masses.
- Cleavage: Distinct {1010}
- Fracture: Irregular/Uneven
- Tenacity: Brittle
- Mohs scale hardness: ≈ 4.5
- Luster: Adamantine to greasy on fracture surfaces, vitreous on cleavage surfaces
- Streak: White
- Diaphaneity: Transparent
- Density: 3.65 – 3.73 g/cm^{3}
- Optical properties: Uniaxial (−)
- Refractive index: nω = 1.687 nε = 1.684
- Birefringence: 0.003
- Pleochroism: Non-pleochroic
- Extinction: Parallel

Johnbaumite is a calcium arsenate hydroxide mineral. It was first described in 1980, where it appeared in Franklin, Sussex County, New Jersey. Johnbaumite was discovered at Harstigen mine in Sweden in the 19th century, but it was described as svabite.

== Etymology ==
It is named after geologist John Leach Baum (March 15, 1916 – October 16, 2011), who found the original specimen in 1944. He was a significant contributor to the geology and mineralogy of the Franklin deposit, and the Curator Emeritus at the Franklin Mineral Museum.

== See also ==
- Hydroxyapatite
- Svabite
