= Topsham quarries =

The Topsham quarries are located in the Cathance Nature Preserve in Topsham, Maine. The group of quarries consist of Havey Quarry, Trenton Quarry, Alice Staples Quarry, and Square Pit. These quarries were dug in the 1800s for minerals. Today Havey Quarry is owned by Richard Carrier and is still used for collecting minerals. Trenton Quarry, Alice Staples Quarry and Square Pit are all owned by John Whitney.

== Trenton Quarry ==
Trenton Quarry is the largest quarry and has the most visitors out of the four. Trenton quarry's deposit type is granite pegmatite, and there are eleven different minerals that are found in Trenton Quarry. The minerals found are albite, almandine, annite, beryl, aquamarine, biotite, columbite, elbaite, microcline, muscovite, and quartz.
