= Caryopilite =

Phyllosilicate mineral in the serpentine subgroup

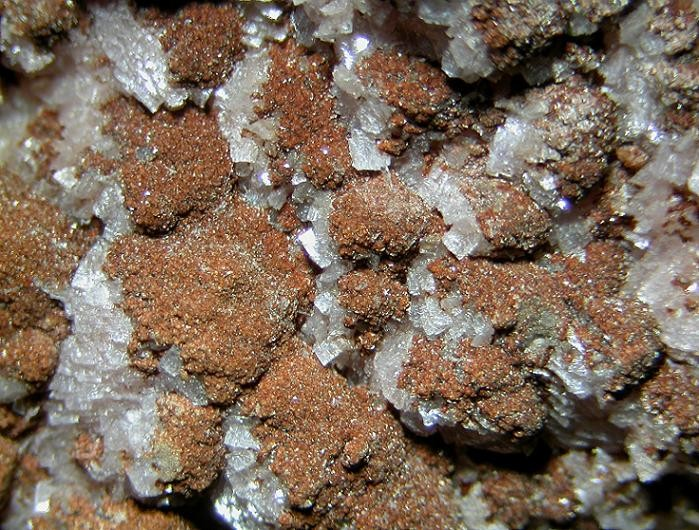
- Brown crust of caryopilite on rhodochrosite

General
- Category: Phyllosilicate minerals
- Group: Kaolinite-Serpentine group, serpentine subgroup
- Formula: (Mn^{2+},Mg)_{3}Si_{2}O_{5}(OH)_{4}
- IMA symbol: Cpl
- Strunz classification: 9.ED.15
- Dana classification: 71.1.2b.1
- Crystal system: Monoclinic
- Crystal class: Domatic (m) (same H-M symbol)
- Space group: Cm
- Unit cell: a = 5.66 Å, b = 9.81 Å, c = 7.52 Å, β = 104.52°; Z = 2

Identification
- Formula mass: 3 to 3.5
- Color: Reddish brown, tan Light brown to yellow in thin section
- Cleavage: Perfect on {001}
- Luster: Vitreous
- Streak: Light Brown
- Diaphaneity: Semitransparent
- Density: 2.83–2.94 (measured)
- Optical properties: Biaxial (-)
- Refractive index: n_{α} = 1.606 to 1.620 n_{β} = 1.632 to 1.650 n_{γ} = 1.632 to 1.650
- Birefringence: δ = 0.026 to 0.030
- 2V angle: ~0°
- Dispersion: Weak

Caryopilite (synonymous with ectropite and ektropite) is a brown-colored mineral with formula (Mn^{2+},Mg)_{3}Si_{2}O_{5}(OH)_{4}. The mineral was discovered in 1889 from a mine in Sweden. It was named for the Greek words for walnut and felt in reference to its appearance.

== Description ==
Caryopilite is reddish-brown to tan in color naturally; in thin sections, it is light brown to yellow. The mineral occurs as tabular pseudohexagonal crystals, commonly as rosettes, up to 4 millimeters (0.16 in). It can also be stalactitic, reniform with a concentrically radiating structure, or have massive habit.

The mineral forms as a product of metamorphism in manganese-bearing minerals. Caryopilite has been found in association with brandtite, calcite, gonyerite, jacobsite, lead, manganoan calcite, rhodonite, sarkinite, tirodite.

== Structure ==
Caryopilite consists of triangular islands formed by tetrahedra rings coordinated with sheets containing octahedrally coordinated manganese. The crystal structure shows some short-range order, but linkages between islands are fully disordered. Thus, no unit cell can truly be defined.

== History ==
In 1889, caryopilite was discovered from the Harstigen Mine in Filipstad, Värmland County, Sweden. Hamberg identified it as a new mineral and, on the suggestion of Professor Brögger, named it karyopilit. The name is derived from the Greek words κάρυον or "walnut", in reference to the mineral's brown color and crystal habit, and πΐλος or "felt", for its appearance under a microscope.

In 1917, Gust Flink discovered a mineral he named ectropite (also spelled ektropite) that was most closely related to caryopilite. In 1927, after a new specimen of bementite was discovered that appeared almost identical to caryopilite, it was recommended that caryopilite be invalidated as a mineral species. However, a 1964 study determined that what had been known as bementite was actually a mixture of two different minerals. Bementite and caryopilite were redefined as distinct species, and caryopilite was made equivalent to ectropite. These changes were accepted by a large majority of the IMA Commission on New Minerals and Mineral Names.

In 1980, a study suggested that caryopilite be assigned to the friedelite group rather than the serpentine group.

== Distribution ==
As of 2012, caryopilite has been found in Austria, Canada, China, France, Italy, Japan, New Zealand, Norway, Romania, Russia, Slovakia, South Africa, Sweden, the UK, and the US.

== Bibliography ==
- Guggenheim, Stephen; Eggleton, Richard A. (February 1998). "Modulated crystal structures of greenalite and caryopilite; a system with long-range, in-plane structural disorder in the tetrahedra sheet". Canadian Mineralogist. 36 (1): 163–179. (subscription required)
- Hamberg, A. (1889). "Über karyopilit, ein wasserhaltiges manganoxydulsilikat von der Grube Harstigen bei Pajsberg in Vermland" (PDF). Geologiska Föreningen i Stockholm Förhandlingar (in German). 11: 27–32.
