= Manganese(II) titanate =

Names
- IUPAC name Manganese(2+) titanate

Identifiers
CAS Number	12032-74-5
3D model (JSmol)	Interactive image
ChemSpider	17345173
ECHA InfoCard	100.031.602
EC Number	234-776-9
PubChem CID	166001
CompTox Dashboard (EPA)	DTXSID80923329
- InChI: InChI=1S/Mn.3O.Ti/q+2;3*-2;+4 Key: IXZOTKANSDQAHZ-UHFFFAOYSA-N
- SMILES: [O-2].[O-2].[O-2].[Ti+4].[Mn+2]

Properties
Chemical formula	MnTiO_{3}
Molar mass	150.82 g/mol
Appearance	green-yellow to brown slabs
Density	3.85 g/cm^{3}
Melting point	1,360 °C (2,480 °F; 1,630 K)
Solubility in water	insoluble

Hazards
NFPA 704 (fire diamond)	0 0 0
- Except where otherwise noted, data are given for materials in their standard state (at 25 °C [77 °F], 100 kPa). Infobox references

Manganese(II) titanate is an inorganic compound with the chemical formula MnTiO_{3}. It occurs in nature as the mineral pyrophanite.
