= Bustamite =

Mineral

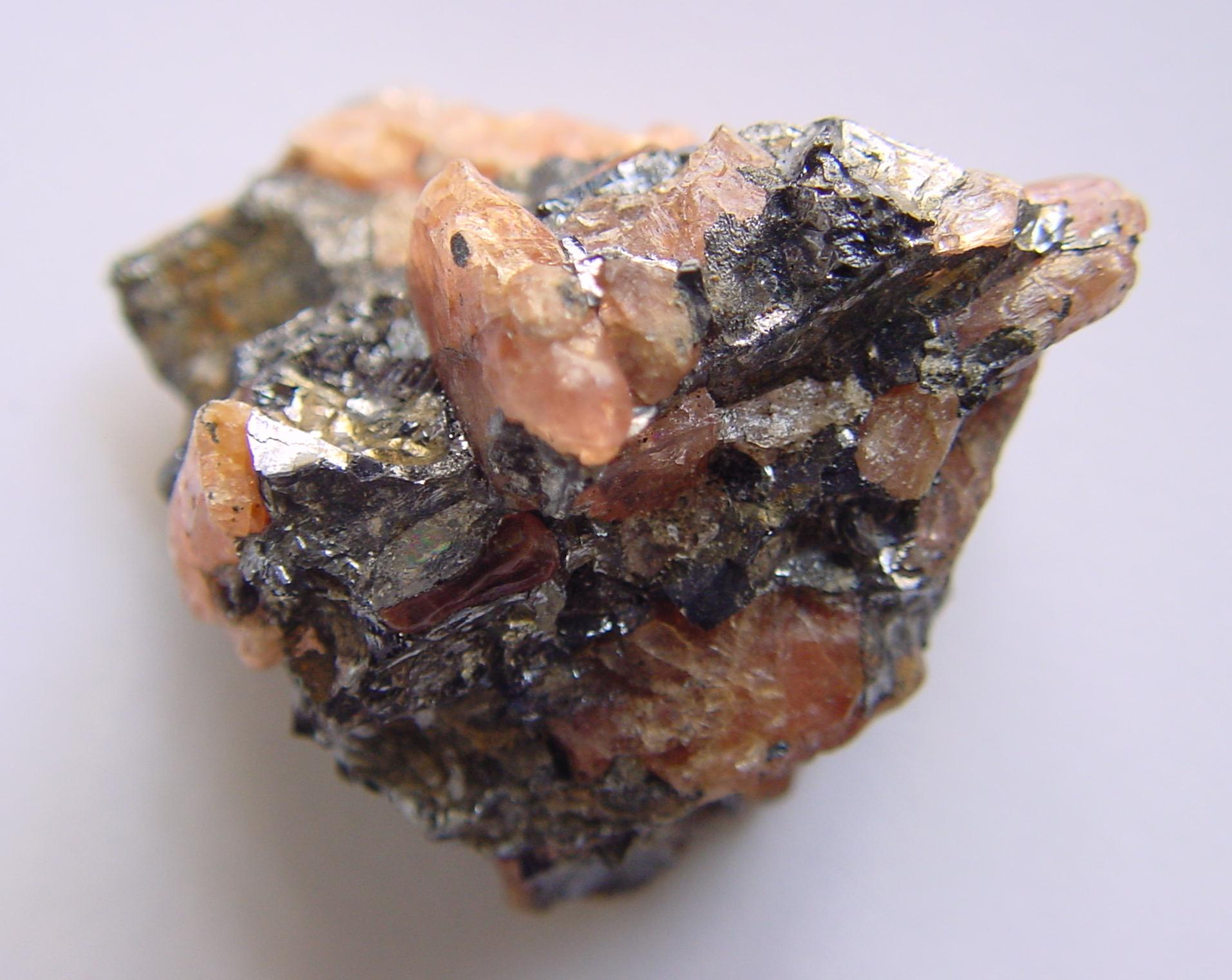
- Bustamite (pink) with galena (grey) from Broken Hill, New South Wales, Australia. Specimen size 3.7 cm.

General
- Category: Inosilicate
- Formula: CaMn^{2+}Si_{2}O_{6}
- IMA symbol: Bst
- Strunz classification: 9.DG.05 (10 ed); 8/F.18.40 (8 ed)
- Dana classification: 65.2.1.2
- Crystal system: Triclinic
- Crystal class: Pinacoidal 1̅ (same H-M symbol)
- Space group: I1̅

Identification
- Color: Light pink to brownish red Pink color fades on exposure to sunlight
- Crystal habit: Usually tabular or equant to prismatic; commonly massive, often compact and fibrous
- Twinning: Rare. Simple twins with (110) as the composition plane
- Cleavage: {100} perfect; {110} and {11̅0} good; {010} poor
- Mohs scale hardness: 5.5 to 6.5
- Luster: Vitreous
- Streak: White
- Diaphaneity: Translucent to transparent
- Specific gravity: 3.32 to 3.43 (observed) 3.40 (calculated)
- Optical properties: Biaxial (−), 2V=34° to 60°
- Refractive index: n_{α} = 1.640 – 1.695, n_{β} = 1.651 – 1.708, n_{γ} = 1.653 – 1.710
- Birefringence: δ = 0.013 – 0.015; Dispersion r < v weak to strong
- Pleochroism: Weak, X and Z orange, Y rose
- Solubility: Partly soluble in HCl.
- Other characteristics: lattice: A B1; Specimens from the Franklin Mine are fluorescent red in longwave ultraviolet light. Not radioactive

Bustamite is a calcium manganese inosilicate (chain silicate) and a member of the wollastonite group. Magnesium, zinc and iron are common impurities substituting for manganese. Bustamite is the high-temperature polymorph of CaMnSi_{2}O_{6} and johannsenite is the low temperature polymorph. The inversion takes place at 830 °C (1,530 °F), but may be very slow.
Bustamite could be confused with light-colored rhodonite or pyroxmangite, but both these minerals are biaxial (+) whereas bustamite is biaxial (−).

== Cell parameters ==
There is considerable variety in the literature about the size and type of the unit cell, the formula to be used, and the value of Z, the number of formula units per unit cell.

Bustamite is a triclinic mineral, which could be described by a primitive unit cell, but the larger A-centered cell is often preferred, in order to facilitate comparison with the similar mineral wollastonite.

The formula for bustamite is CaMn(SiO_{3})_{2} but it is sometimes written (Ca,Mn)SiO_{3}, and changing the formula in this way will change the value of Z. The structure is chains of SiO_{4} tetrahedra with repeat unit of three tetrahedra, unlike the pyroxenes where the repeat unit is two. Ca^{++} and Mn^{++} are positioned between the chains. There are 12 tetrahedra in the A-centered unit cell.

The unit cell, the formula and Z cannot be taken separately; they are interlinked and form a consistent set of values. This article adopts the A-centred unit cell (space group A1̅) with a = 7.736 Å, b = 7.157 Å and c = 13.824 Å, the formula CaMn(SO_{3})_{3} and Z = 6. Deer et al. take the formula as (Mn,Ca,Fe)[SiO_{3}] so their value of Z is doubled to 12. Mindat apparently gives the lattice parameters for a face-centred cell, although they give the space group as P1̅.

== Type locality ==
The type locality was originally taken as Tetela de Jonotla, Puebla, Mexico, and the mineral was named for the Mexican mineralogist José María Bustamante y Septiem, professor at the Mexico Mining Seminary. The material from Puebla, however, was later found to be a mixture of johannsenite and rhodonite, so the type locality is now the Franklin Mine, Franklin, Sussex County, New Jersey, US.

Both bustamite and johansennite are found at Franklin. Bustamite is moderately common there and occurs in a variety of assemblages, associated with rhodonite and tephroite, calcite and tephroite or glaucochroite and tephroite. Vesuvianite, wollastonite, garnet, diopside, willemite, johannsenite, margarosanite and clinohedrite also may be present.

== Environment ==
Bustamite typically results from metamorphism of manganese-bearing sediments, with attendant metasomatism. At the (new) type locality, Franklin, the oldest rocks are Precambrian gneisses of mixed sedimentary and volcanic origin. Franklin Marble was deposited within these rocks, along with sediments containing zinc, manganese and iron minerals. These sediments were metamorphosed later in the Precambrian, then the rocks were uplifted from the late Precambrian into the Cambrian and quartzite was deposited on the eroded surface. In Cambrian-Ordovician time the quartzite was in turn overlain by limestone, and the rocks have been subject to uplift and erosion up to the present time.
