= Johannsenite =

Silicate mineral in the pyroxene family

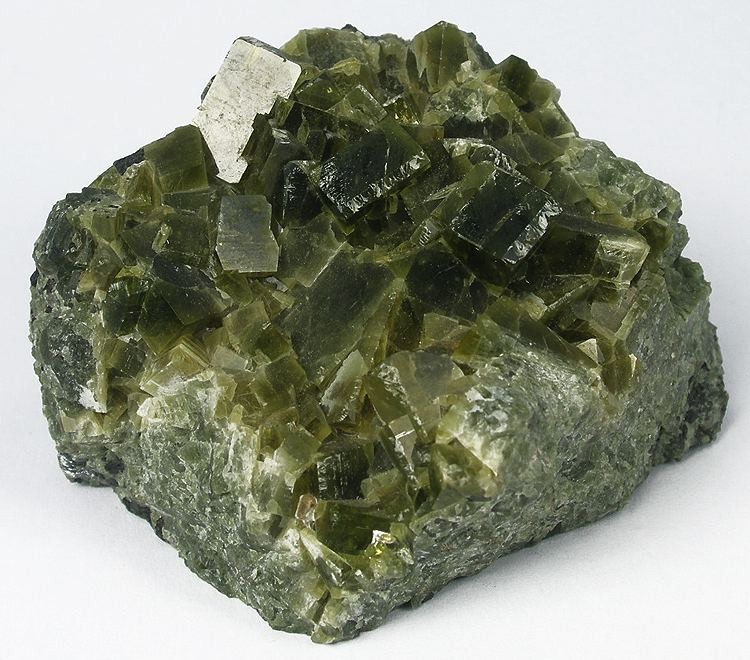

General
- Category: Minerals
- Formula: CaMn^{2+}Si_{2}O_{6}
- IMA symbol: Jhn
- Crystal system: Monoclinic

Identification
- Color: blue-green, grey-white, dark brown, colourless
- Mohs scale hardness: 6
- Streak: white

Johannsenite is a silicate mineral that is a member of the pyroxene family. The mineral can be produced in limestone or due a metamorphic process. The mineral is also associated with Pb-Zn mineralization.

It is a relatively rare material. but is said to be abundant in the Aravaipa region of Arizona. It is commonly found as a spherulite like aggregate.

The mineral is vulnerable to oxidation, hydration, and carbonation. It is also commonly altered to rhodonite.

The mineral was named in 1932 after Albert Johannsen.

== Occurrence ==
It can be found in countries like Mexico, Italy, Australia, the United States, Australia, and Japan.

Johannsenite can be found in limestone affected by the element magnesium during metamorphosis. It is also found in veins.
