= Axinite-(Mg) =

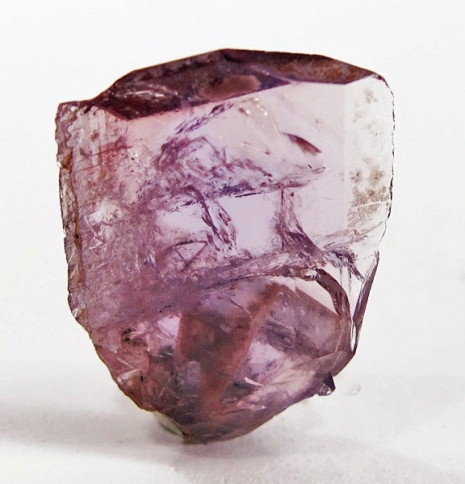
- Crystal fragment of gem axinite-(Mg) from Merelani Hills, Manyara, Tanzania

General
- Category: Silicate mineral
- Formula: Ca_{2}MgAl_{2}BSi_{4}O_{15}OH
- Crystal system: Triclinic

Identification
- Color: Light blue, pink
- Crystal habit: Crystals with the characteristic axe shape
- Cleavage: Good {100}
- Fracture: Uneven to subconchoidal
- Tenacity: Somewhat brittle
- Mohs scale hardness: 6 1/2 - 7
- Luster: Vitreous
- Streak: White
- Diaphaneity: Transparent or translucent
- Specific gravity: 4.97

Axinite-(Mg) is a borosilicate mineral of aluminum, calcium and magnesium of the axinite group, with magnesium as the dominant cation in the place of the structure that can also be occupied by iron and manganese. It was discovered in gem material from Merelani Hills, Lelatema Mts, Manyara Region, Tanzania, which is consequently its type locality. It was initially called magnesioaxinite, referring to its membership in the axinite group and the role of magnesium as the dominant cation. The International Mineralogical Association (IMA) later changed its name to axinite-(Mg). Occasionally it has been carved as a collection gem.

== Physical and chemical properties ==
Like the rest of the minerals in the axinite group, axinite-(Mg) belongs to the triclinic system, appearing in the form of crystals with the characteristic ax-shaped morphology. Its structure can be described as a sequence of alternating layers of cations coordinated tetrahedrally and octahedrally.

== Deposits ==
The axinite group minerals are found in medium-to-low contact metamorphism, regional or metasomatic environments, in boron-containing environments. Axinite-(Mg) appears more frequently in areas of contact metamorphism.

It is a relatively rare mineral, known in about a dozen locations in the world. In addition to the type locality, already indicated, in which specimens with transparent crystals of various colors, up to 3 cm in size, have been found in the area of Lunning, Mineral Co., Nevada (USA), as violet brown crystals. In Spain, axinite-(Mg) associated with crystalline calcite has been found in the diabase of a quarry located in El Zurcido, Adamuz (Córdoba) .
