= Hardystonite =

Sorosilicate mineral

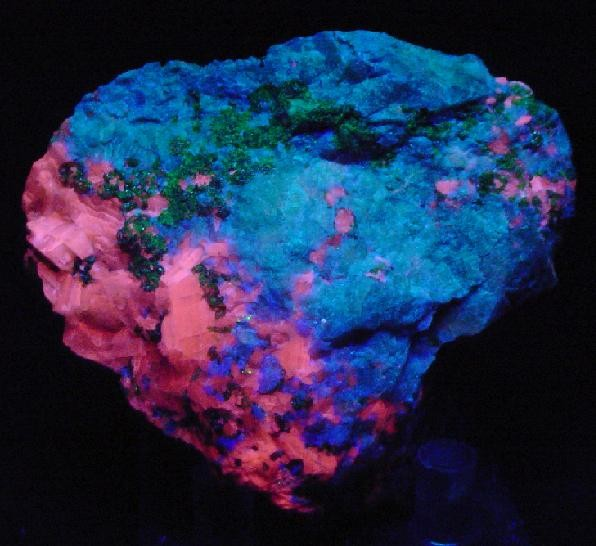
- Hardystonite is fluorescing blue in this Franklin Furnace specimen. Red is calcite, and green is willemite (size: 7.0 × 6.0 × 3.2 cm)

General
- Category: Sorosilicates
- Formula: Ca_{2}ZnSi_{2}O_{7}
- IMA symbol: Hdy
- Strunz classification: 9.BB.10
- Dana classification: 55.4.2.2
- Crystal system: Tetragonal
- Crystal class: Scalenohedral (4̅2m); H-M symbol: (4̅ 2m)
- Space group: P4̅2_{1}m
- Unit cell: a = 7.8287(16) Å c = 5.0140(2) Å; Z = 2

Identification
- Color: Light brownish white, pale greyish-white, very pale pink
- Crystal habit: Massive granular
- Cleavage: [001] good, [100] and [110] fair
- Tenacity: Brittle
- Mohs scale hardness: 3–4
- Luster: Vitreous, resinous, greasy, dull
- Diaphaneity: Transparent to translucent
- Specific gravity: 3.396–3.443
- Optical properties: Uniaxial (−)
- Refractive index: n_{ω} = 1.672 n_{ε} = 1.661
- Ultraviolet fluorescence: Purple to violet blue in short wave ultraviolet light
- Alters to: Hydrothermal alteration to clinohedrite

Hardystonite is a rare calcium zinc silicate mineral first described from the Franklin, New Jersey, U.S. zinc deposits. It often contains lead, which was detrimental to the zinc smelting process, so it was not a useful ore mineral. Like many of the famous Franklin minerals, hardystonite responds to short wave ultraviolet (254 nm wavelength) light, emitting a fluorescence from dark purple to bright violet blue. In daylight, it is white to gray to light pink in color, sometimes with a vitreous or greasy luster. It is very rarely found as well formed crystals, and these are usually rectangular in appearance and rock-locked.

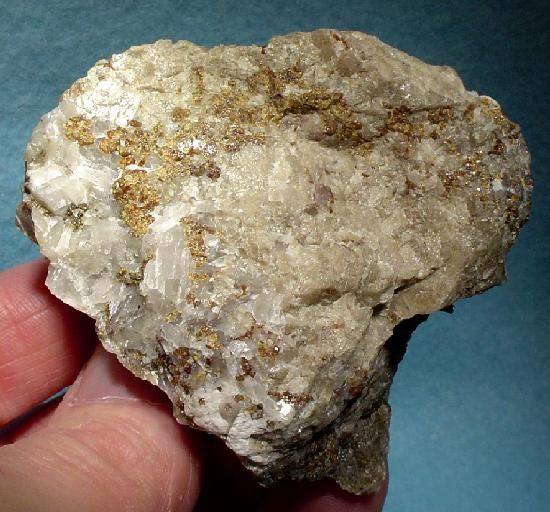
Hardystonite in plain light, same sample as in fluorescent light image above right

Hardystonite has a chemical composition of Ca_{2}ZnSi_{2}O_{7}. It is frequently found with willemite (fluoresces green), calcite (fluoresces red), and clinohedrite (fluoresces orange). Hardystonite can be found altered to clinohedrite CaZn(SiO_{4})·H_{2}O through direct hydrothermal alteration. Other minerals often associated with hardystonite are franklinite, diopside, andradite garnet, and esperite (fluoresces yellow).

It was first described in 1899 by J.E. Wolff, when the New Jersey Zinc Company mines were located in what was called Franklin Furnace, in Hardyston Township, New Jersey.
