= Franklin Furnace =

Coordinates: 41°06′58″N 74°35′15″W

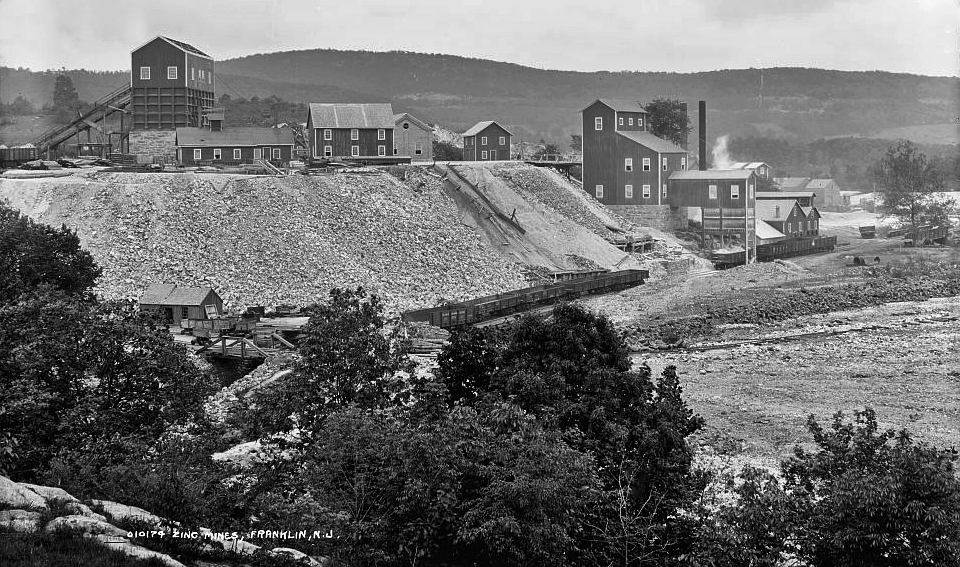
Franklin Furnace ca. 1900

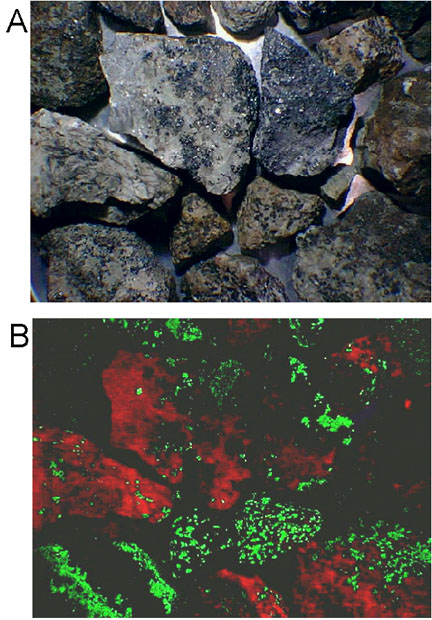
Fluorescent minerals of the Franklin mineral district: franklinite (black), willemite (green), and calcite (red). USGS

Franklin Furnace, also known as the Franklin Mine, is a famous mineral location for rare zinc, iron, and manganese minerals in old mines in Franklin, Sussex County, New Jersey, United States. This locale produced more species of minerals (over 300) and more different fluorescent minerals than any other location. The mineral association (assemblage) from Franklin includes willemite, zincite and franklinite.

During the mid-to-late 19th century the furnace was the center of a large iron making operation. Russian, Chilean, British, Irish, Hungarian and Polish immigrants came to Franklin to work in the mines, and the population of Franklin swelled from 500 (in 1897) to over 3,000 (in 1913).

The Furnace mine, which was adjacent to the actual furnace, was a 120+ foot vertical shaft just under Franklin Falls.

Other rare minerals include esperite, clinohedrite, hardystonite, and others. There are scores of minerals found only here, such as johnbaumite (an arsenous apatite), etc.

Sterling Hill, a very similar zinc orebody, is located a few miles away in Ogdensburg.

== See also ==
- Franklin Mineral Museum
