= Esperite =

Nesosilicate mineral

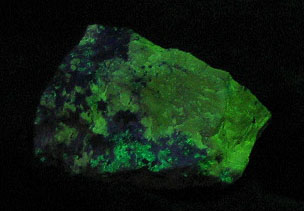
- Esperite under ultraviolet light

General
- Category: Silicate mineral
- Formula: PbCa_{3}Zn_{4}(SiO_{4})_{4}
- IMA symbol: Epr
- Strunz classification: 9.AB.15
- Crystal system: Monoclinic
- Crystal class: Prismatic (2/m) (same H-M symbol)
- Space group: P2_{1}/m

Identification
- Color: White
- Crystal habit: Typically massive
- Cleavage: Distinct on [010] and [100] – poor on [101]
- Fracture: Conchoidal, brittle
- Mohs scale hardness: 5–5.5
- Luster: Vitreous
- Streak: White
- Diaphaneity: Subtranslucent to opaque
- Specific gravity: 4.28–4.42
- Optical properties: Biaxial (−), 2V measured: 5° to 40°
- Refractive index: nα = 1.762 nβ = 1.770 nγ = 1.774
- Birefringence: Max δ = 0.012
- Other characteristics: Brilliant yellow fluorescence under SW UV; kelly green cathodoluminescence.

Esperite is a rare complex calcium lead zinc silicate (PbCa_{3}Zn_{4}(SiO_{4})_{4}) related to beryllonite and trimerite that used to be called calcium larsenite. It was named in honor of Esper F. Larsen Jr. (1879–1961), petrologist of Harvard University.

Esperite has a white, greasy appearance in daylight and is much prized for its brilliant yellow green fluorescence under shortwave ultraviolet light. It is found in association with calcite, franklinite, willemite, hardystonite and clinohedrite. It has also been found as prismatic crystals up to 1 mm in length at the El Dragon Mine, Potosi, Bolivia in association with allophane, chalcomenite, clinochalcomenite and barite.
