= Franklin Mineral Museum =

Geology and mining museum in New Jersey, USA

Coordinates: 41.1133°N 74.5884°W

The Franklin Mineral Museum in Franklin, New Jersey, is a mineral, geology, and mining museum at the former Franklin Mine. It is located in Sussex County, New Jersey.

== History ==
The mine was active from 1898 until the mid-1950s.

The mine site became an open-air museum in 1964.

== Features ==
The Franklin Mineral Museum has a large mineral collection, a simulated mine tunnel, and Native American artifacts. Visitors are allowed to collect mineral specimens in several areas of the former mine's tailings.

Local minerals room – here are collections with more than 5,000 mineral specimens on display. It is one of the biggest and most diverse collections of minerals in the world. It includes important ore minerals, pegmatite, volcanic rocks, and others.

Fluorescent minerals room – here one can explore the surreal display of fluorescent minerals. The main display is 32 feet long and it is unsurpassed in the world for the variety of its colors.

Native American Room – there are numerous Native American artifacts, including the collection of stone tools made by the Lenni Lenape Indians, the earliest inhabitants of what later became New Jersey. The collection contains artifacts from all over the United States and Mexico, and includes tools such as axes, spear heads, and knives, as well as some pottery and baskets.

Fossil room – there are a variety of fossils from dinosaurs and different animals.

World room – a collection of worldwide minerals, numbering more than 5,000 specimens.

Mine replica – the replica was originally constructed by the New Jersey Zinc Company as a safety training facility for its miners. It contains life-size underground mine passages where visitors can explore the mines and see first-hand the mining methods that were used.
