= Argazi Reservoir =

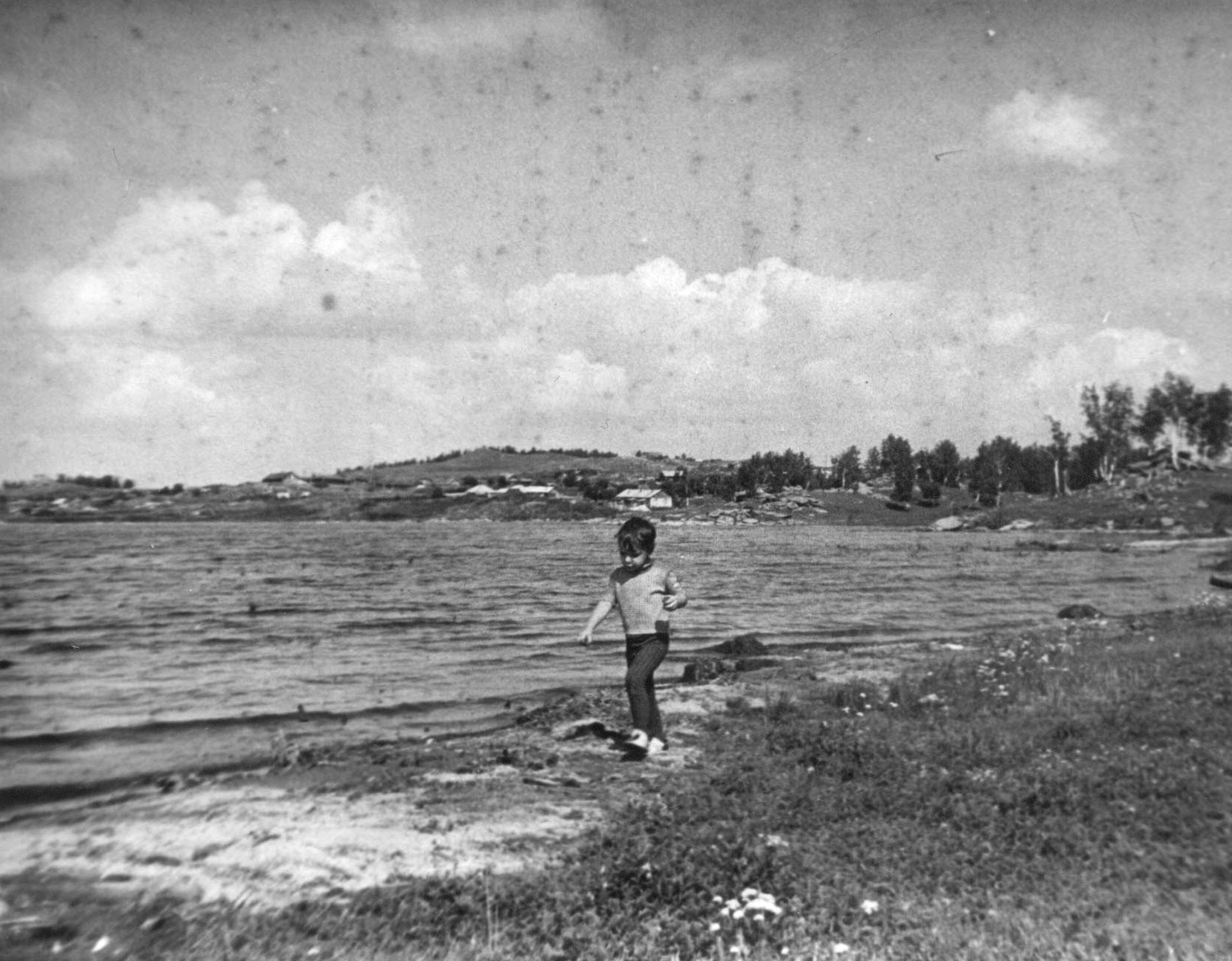

- Location within Russia
- Location: Chelyabinsk Oblast
- Coordinates: 55°22′53″N 60°23′21″E
- Type: reservoir
- Primary inflows: Miass River
- Primary outflows: Miass River
- Basin countries: Russia
- Surface area: 102 km^{2} (39 sq mi)
- Average depth: 6.5 m (21 ft)
- Water volume: 0.65 km^{3} (0.16 cu mi)

Argazi Reservoir (Russian: Аргазинское водохранилище) is a reservoir, created on the Miass River (Tobol's basin) in Chelyabinsk Oblast (Russia) in 1946. The Argazi Lake has become a part of the Argazi Reservoir ever since. The reservoir has a surface area of 102 km² and a water volume of 0,65 cubic km. Its length is 11 km, average depth - 6,5 m. The Argazi Reservoir was created for the benefit of energetics and water supply. It also performs perennial flow regulation.

== Name ==
Argazi Reservoir name is taken from the Bashkirs (Bashkir: Арғужа), the indigenous inhabitants of these places.

== Reservoir in culture ==
There is Bashkir folk song about Argazi lake (Bashkir: Арғужа) later became a reservoir.

Bashkir

Арғужа ла буйы, ай, һары тал,
Юнып ҡына алған ук кеүек.
Уйлаган да уйҙар, ай, юҡ кеүек,
Эскенәйем яна уҡ кеүек.

Арғужа ла буйлап йөрөгәнемдә,
Ятып ҡалды ҡайыш дилбегәм.
Дилбегәм дә өсөн ҡайғырмайым -
Ятып ҡалды тыуган илгенәм.

Арғужа ла буйлап йөрөгәнемдә
Исемемде яҙҙым ташына.
Ағай ла энә һүҙен тыңламайса,
Еттем, буғай, ғәзиз башыма.

Russian

Вдоль Аргужи, ай, желтый тальник,
Выструганным стрелам подобен.
Обдумываемых мыслей, ай, нет вроде бы,
Душа моя горит огню подобно.

Вдоль Аргужи когда ходил я,
Лежать остались мои ременные вожжи.
Из-за вожжей моих я не горюю -
Лежать осталась родная моя страна.

Вдоль Аргужи когда ходил я,
Имя мое написал я на камне.
Старших и младших (родственников) слов не послушав,
Погубил я, кажется, свою дорогую голову

English

Along Arguzhi, ah, yellow willow,
Planed arrows similar.
Ponders the thought, ah, do not like,
My soul burns like fire.

Arguzhi along when I went,
Lie left my belt reins.
Due to the reins of my I do not grieve -
Lie left my dear country.

Arguzhi along when I went,
I wrote my name in stone.
Senior and junior (relatives) words are not listened to,
I ruined it seems his dear head
