= Friedelite =

Phyllosilicate mineral

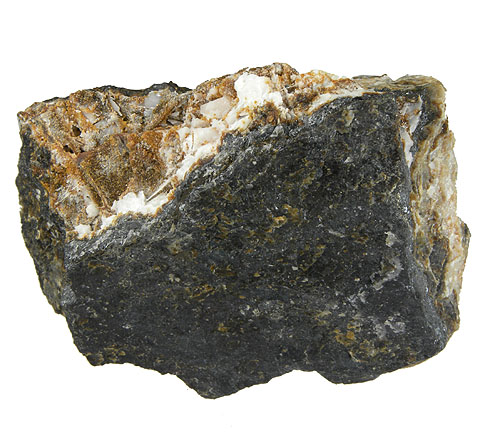
- Sterling Mine, Sterling Hill, Ogdensburg, New Jersey

General
- Category: Phyllosilicate minerals
- IMA symbol: Fdl

Identification
- Mohs scale hardness: 4 - 5
- Streak: White

Friedelite is a mineral in the pyrosmalite group. The mineral is named after Charles Friedel.

== Name ==
The name friedelite is only for pure Manganese end-member of the group pyrosmalite.

The mineral was named in 1876 by Emile Bertrand after Charles Friedel.

== Characteristics ==
=== Color ===
Its color can be pale pink, dark brownish red, red, brown, or orangish red. It is normally found in 1 to 5 carats as well as nontransparent.

=== Fluorescence ===
The mineral has a colorful luminescence under UV light. With the fluorescence being typically red, but can rarely have a green or yellow fluorescence.
