= Svabite =

Chemical compound

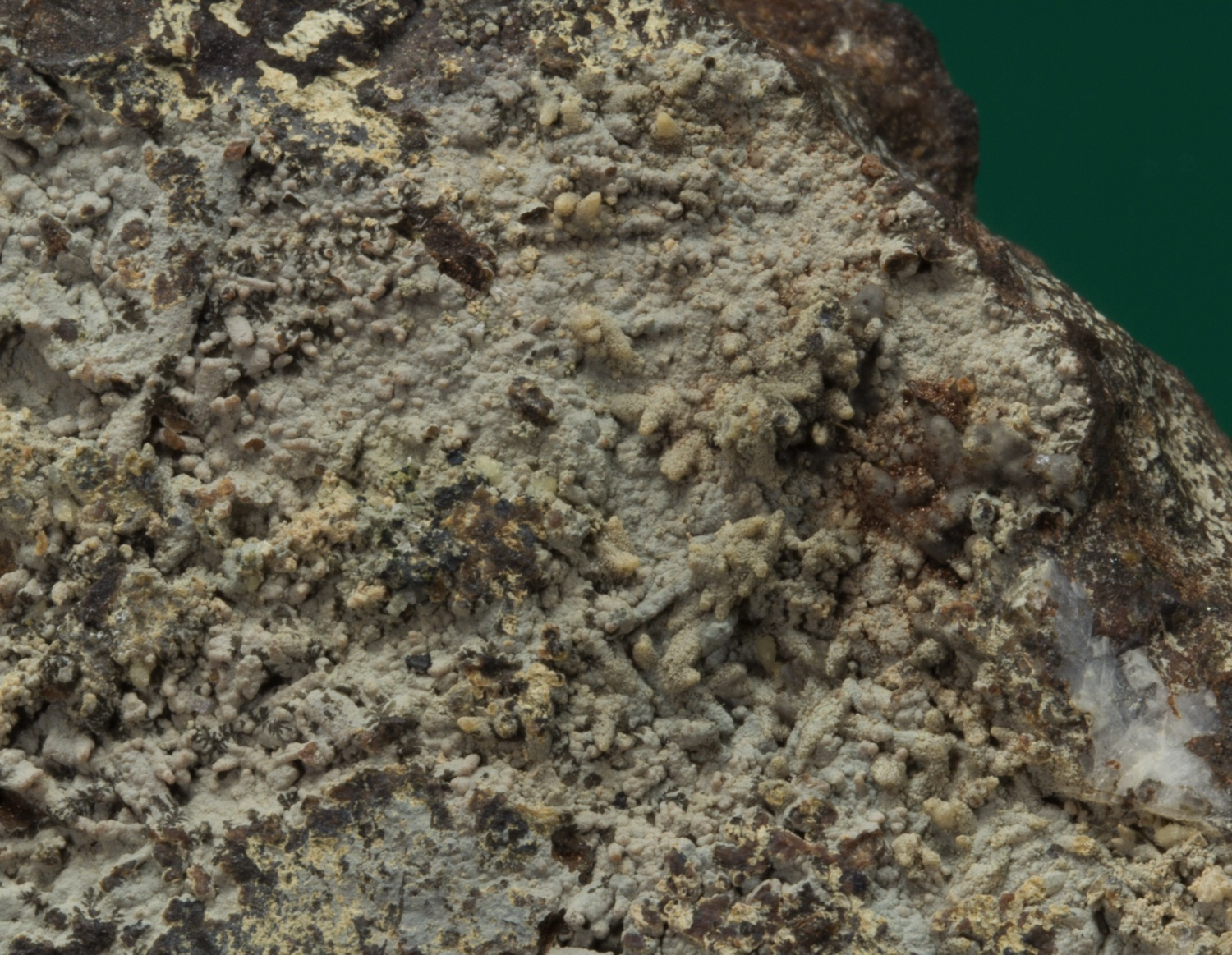

General
- Category: Minerals
- Formula: Ca_{5}(AsO_{4})_{3}(F,OH)
- IMA symbol: Sva

Identification
- Color: Colorless yellowish white, gray, grayish green, colorless to pale lilac in transmitted light
- Crystal habit: As stout prismatic hexagonal crystals, often modified by several bipyramids, up to 5 mm; also massive
- Cleavage: Indistinct on {1010}
- Fracture: Irregular/uneven
- Tenacity: Brittle
- Mohs scale hardness: 4.0 – 5.0
- Density: 3.50 – 3.80 (g/cm^{3})
- Refractive index: 1.698 – 1.706 Uniaxial (−)
- Other characteristics: Soluble in dilute acids

Svabite is an arsenate mineral. The mineral is rare and is also a member of the apatite group. It is isomorphous with apatite and mimetite.

It got its name in 1891 by Hjalmar Sjögren after Anton von Swab.

== Occurrence ==
Svabite can be found in countries like Sweden or Germany.

The mineral is rare in calc-silicate skarns and arsenate analogue.
