= Manganophyllite =

Mica mineral in the biotite subgroup

General
- Category: Phyllosilicate minerals
- Group: Mica group, trioctahedral mica group, biotite subgroup
- Formula: K(Fe,Mg,Mn)_{3}AlSi_{3}O_{10}(OH)_{2}
- Crystal system: Monoclinic
- Space group: C2/m

Identification
- Color: Brown, reddish brown, yellowish brown, orange, coppery red
- Twinning: (001)
- Cleavage: {010}
- Mohs scale hardness: 2.5 - 3
- Luster: Bronzy
- Optical properties: Uniaxial, biaxial
- Pleochroism: Visible
- 2V angle: 0° - 40°
- Absorption spectra: γ = β > α

Manganopyhllite is a manganese-rich variety of biotite. It was first discovered in the Harstigen mine in Sweden. The mineral was first described in 1890. The earliest use is from Edward Dana.

== Etymology ==
The name manganophyllite also suggests the manganese-rich properties of said gem, as the name originates from the word mangano-, used for substances containing manganese in chemistry. Manganoan biotite is the only synonym of Manganophllite.

== Properties ==
It shows pleochroic properties, which is an optical phenomenon. Depending on which angle the mineral is inspected, the color of it differs. On the α optical axis, the mineral is pale pink to pink, with an orange tinge, on β and γ axes it is seen in a yellowish brown to dark brown color. On γ, it can also be yellowish brown, with a pink or reddish brown tinge on occasion. The pleochroism greatly differs, and in a few cases is close to biotite's pleochroism when manganophyllite is interlaminated. The optic axial angles differ between 0° to 40°. The cause of it is unknown, although there are theories to that. It could be due to the iron or manganese effecting the optical characters of the mineral. Another theory suggests it is due to the micas being either uniaxial or biaxial, sometimes strongly so. Another study also stresses the optical properties of the minerals. That is, several of the specimens have the optic plane normal to (010), instead of parallel with it. The cause of the anomalies are undetermined in that case, despite the orientation of said specimens were determined with x-ray methods. The mineral can occur as both flakes and books, and has a hexagonal crystal structure. Chemical tests also showed a great amount of iron and magnesia. There are examples of 1 and 2-layer monoclinic structures, but a 3-layer one is yet to be seen. Minerals with a very small 2V approach this 3-layer hexagonal structure and show a twinning on (001) of thin sheets, just as in uniaxial lepidolites. Further chemical inspection also shows no correlation between polymorphism and composition. In the 1-layer specimens, the quantity of magnesium and iron differs mineral by mineral. To put it in numbers, the Fe_{2}O_{3} quantity ranges between 0 and 16.94%. Others include FeO between 0 and 2.54%, MgO between 21.18 and 29.28%, MnO between 0 and 9.25% Mn_{2}O_{3} between 0 and 8.30% and TiO_{2} between 0 and 0.55%.

== Classification ==
From the available data, it is certain the mica composition continuously varies, thus it was hard to accurately tell which specie it is from. There were suggestions it originates from amphibole, as it is usually associated with it, but a closer inspection from under a microscope tells otherwise, as manganophyllite can be found in both the winchite-blanfordite, and also in the quartz-feldspar portion, therefore the origin of it was uncertain. This was in 1957. In 1966 however, the author claims the mineral is commonly associated, and sometimes interlaminated with biotite. It was also discovered that manganophyllite's relationship towards other minerals, and its metamorphic texture suggests that it must have originated from manganese, iron and magnesia rich sediments. Currently manganophyllite is considered a member of the biotite group, a manganese-rich variant of biotite.
