= Axinite =

Group of minerals

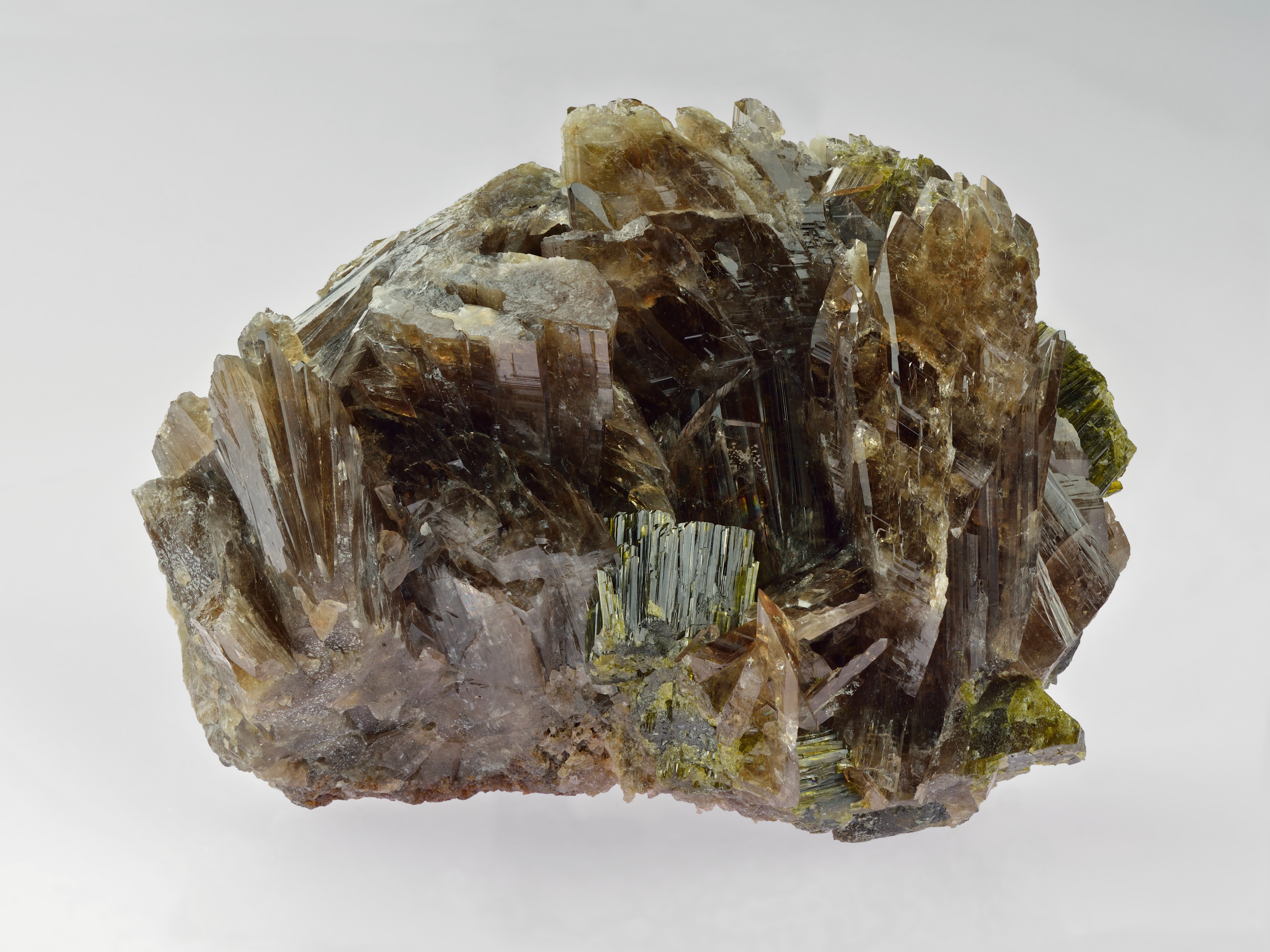
- Manganaxinite

General
- Category: Cyclosilicates
- Formula: (Ca,Fe,Mn)_{3}Al_{2}BO_{3}Si_{4}O_{12}OH or Ca_{2}(Fe,Mn)Al_{2}BSi_{4}O_{15}(OH)
- IMA symbol: Ax
- Strunz classification: 9.BD.20
- Crystal system: Triclinic
- Crystal class: Pinacoidal (1̅) (same H-M symbol)
- Space group: P1̅

Identification
- Color: Reddish brown to yellow to colorless. Blue, violet, grey.
- Crystal habit: Tabular, wedge shaped crystals
- Cleavage: Good on {100}
- Fracture: Conchoidal
- Mohs scale hardness: 6.0–7.5
- Luster: Vitreous
- Streak: White
- Specific gravity: 3.18–3.37
- Optical properties: Biaxial (−)
- Refractive index: n_{α} = 1.672–1.693 n_{β} = 1.677–1.701 n_{γ} = 1.681–1.704
- Birefringence: δ = 0.011
- Pleochroism: Strong

Axinite is a brown to violet-brown, or reddish-brown bladed group of minerals composed of calcium aluminium boro-silicate, (Ca,Fe,Mn)_{3}Al_{2}BO_{3}Si_{4}O_{12}OH. Axinite is pyroelectric and piezoelectric.

The axinite group includes:

- Axinite-(Fe) or ferroaxinite, Ca_{2}Fe^{2+}Al_{2}BOSi_{4}O_{15}(OH) iron rich, clove-brown, brown, plum-blue, pearl-gray
- Axinite-(Mg) or magnesioaxinite, Ca_{2}MgAl_{2}BOSi_{4}O_{15}(OH) magnesium rich, pale blue to pale violet; light brown to light pink
- Axinite-(Mn) or manganaxinite, Ca_{2}Mn^{2+}Al_{2}BOSi_{4}O_{15}(OH) manganese rich, honey-yellow, clove-brown, brown to blue
- Tinzenite (CaFe^{2+}Mn^{2+})_{3}Al_{2}BOSi_{4}O_{15}(OH) iron – manganese intermediate, yellow, brownish yellow-green

Axinite is sometimes used as a gemstone.

== Gallery ==
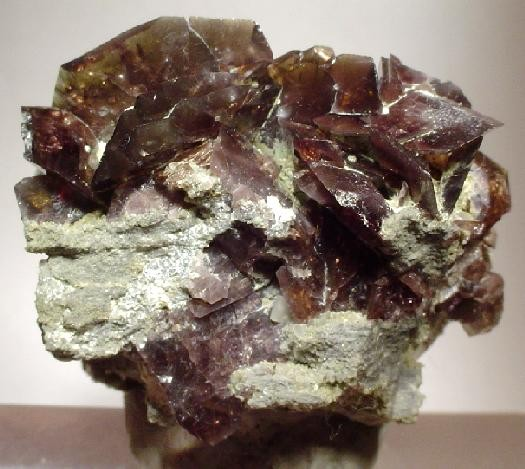
Clove-brown axinite crystals to 2.3 cm set atop matrix from the West Bor Pit at Dalnegorsk, Russia

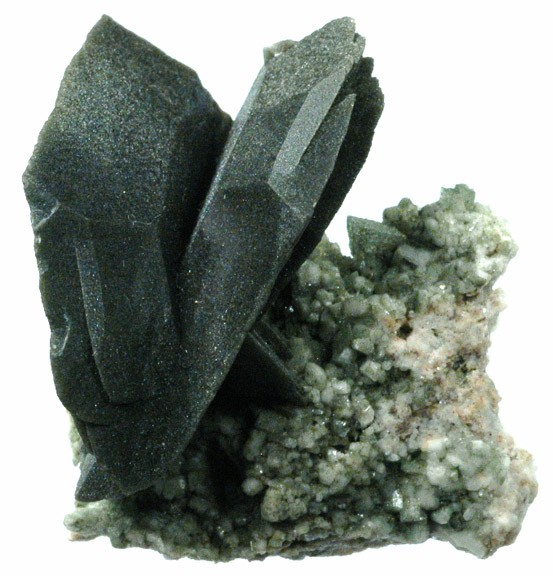
Chloritized bladed crystals of axinite forming on adularia from the Swiss Alps

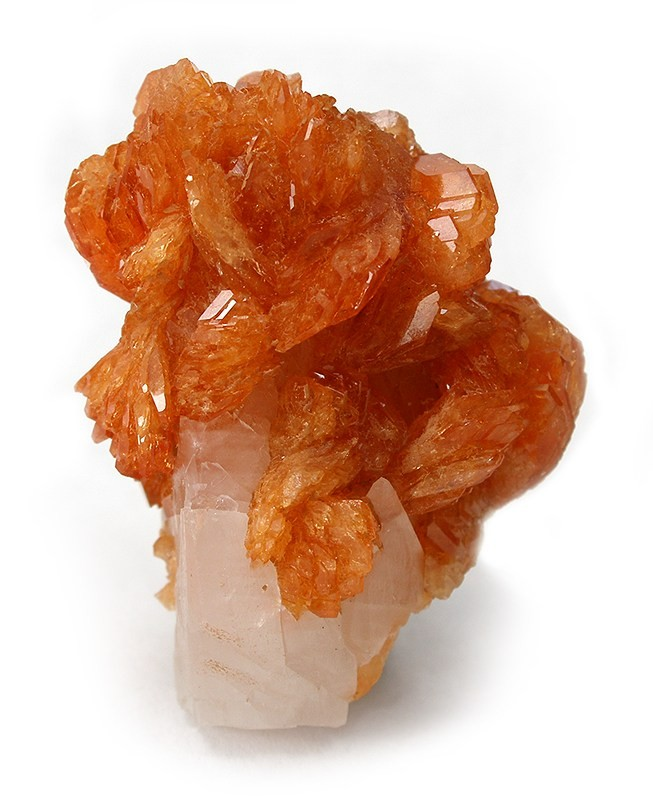
Tinzenite on calcite, 4.5 × 3.5 × 3 cm. Wessels Mine, Kalahari manganese fields, Northern Cape Province, South Africa

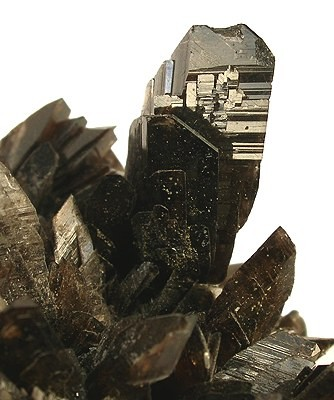
Manganaxinite (Axinite-(Mn)), with sharp curving crystals to 4 cm. West Bor Pit at Dalnegorsk, Russia
