= Clinohedrite =

Mineral composed of calcium–zinc silicate

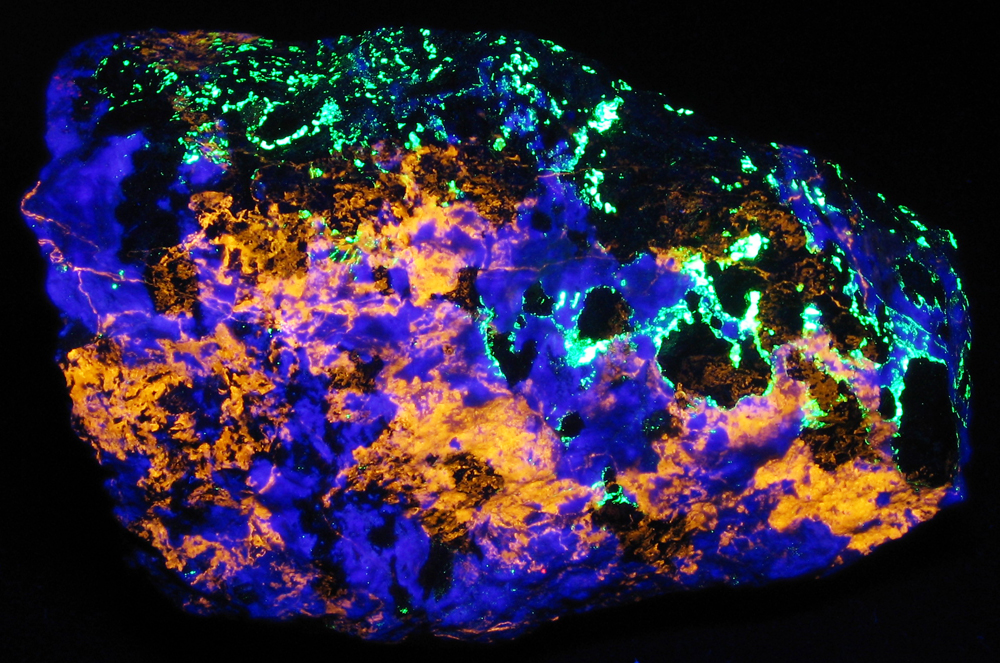
- Clinohedrite coating hardystonite, franklinite with willemite reaction rims. Franklin, New Jersey. Orange fluorescence under UV.

General
- Category: Silicate mineral
- Formula: CaZn(SiO_{4})·H_{2}O
- IMA symbol: Cnh
- Strunz classification: 9.AE.30
- Dana classification: 52.2.1.2
- Crystal system: Monoclinic
- Crystal class: Domatic (m) (same H-M symbol)
- Space group: Cc
- Unit cell: a = 5.09 Å, b = 15.82 Å, c = 5.38 Å; β = 103.39°; Z = 4

Identification
- Color: Colorless to brown surface coating, clear to pale pink to amethystine crystals
- Crystal habit: Thin to thick or platey surface and fracture coatings, in vugs or cavities, rarely as crusts of crystals – prismatic to tabular, may be wedge-shaped
- Cleavage: Perfect on {010}
- Mohs scale hardness: 5.5
- Luster: Brilliant, glassy; pearly on {010}
- Streak: white
- Diaphaneity: Transparent to translucent
- Specific gravity: 3.28–3.33
- Optical properties: Biaxial (−)
- Refractive index: n_{α} = 1.662 n_{β} = 1.667 n_{γ} = 1.669
- Ultraviolet fluorescence: UV=orange
- Other characteristics: Strongly pyroelectric

Clinohedrite is a rare silicate mineral. Its chemical composition is a hydrous calcium-zinc silicate; CaZn(SiO_{4})·H_{2}O. It crystallizes in the monoclinic system and typically occurs as veinlets and fracture coatings. It is commonly colorless, white to pale amethyst in color. It has perfect cleavage and the crystalline habit has a brilliant luster. It has a Mohs hardness of 5.5 and a specific gravity of 3.28–3.33.

Under short wave ultraviolet light it fluoresces a rich orange color. It is frequently associated with minerals such as hardystonite (fluoresces violet blue), esperite (fluoresces bright yellow), calcite (fluoresces orange-red), franklinite (non-fluorescent) and willemite (fluoresces green).

Clinohedrite was found primarily at the Franklin zinc mines in New Jersey, the type locality, but has also been reported from the Christmas mine, Gila County, Arizona, and the Western Quinling gold belt, Gansu Province, China.

It was first described in 1898 and was named for its crystal morphology from the Greek klino for incline, and hedra for face.
