= Rhodonite =

Single chain manganese inosilicate (MnSiO_{3})

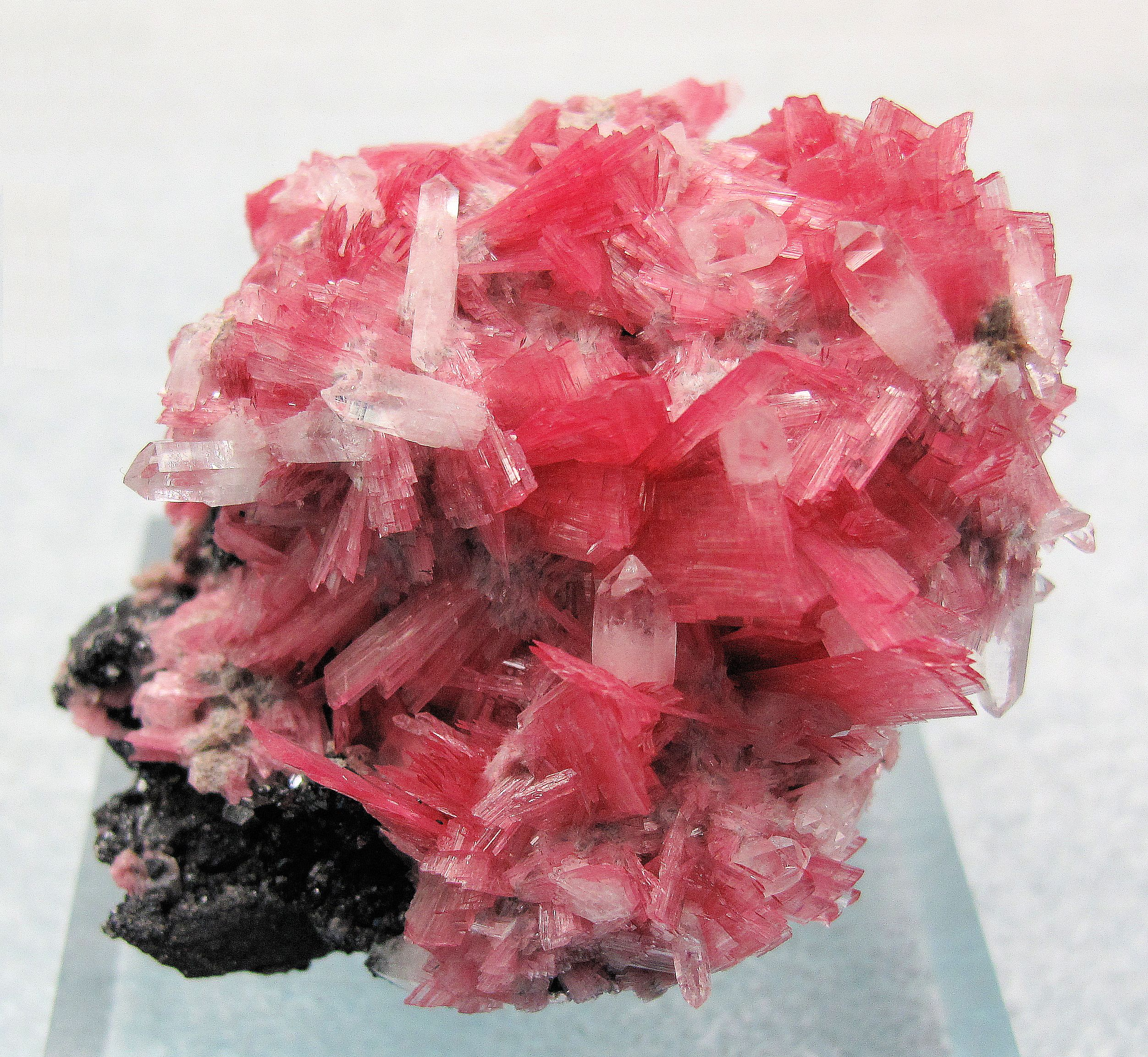
- Rhodonite from San Martín Mine, Chiurucu, Huallanca District, Bolognesi Province, Ancash, Peru; Specimen size: 53 mm × 52 mm × 40 mm (2.1 in × 2.0 in × 1.6 in)

General
- Category: Inosilicate minerals (single chain)
- Group: Pyroxene group
- Formula: (Mn^{2+}, Fe^{2+}, Mg, Ca)SiO_{3}
- IMA symbol: Rdn
- Strunz classification: 9.DK.05
- Dana classification: 65.04.01.01
- Crystal system: Triclinic
- Crystal class: Pinacoidal (1̅) (same H–M symbol)
- Space group: P1̅
- Unit cell: a = 9.758 Å, b = 10.499 Å, c = 12.205 Å; α = 108.58°, β = 102.92°, γ = 82.52°; Z = 20

Identification
- Color: Pink, rose-pink to brownish red, red, gray and yellow
- Crystal habit: Tabular crystals, massive, granular
- Twinning: Lamellar, composition plane {010}
- Cleavage: Perfect on {110} and {11̅0}, (110) ^ (11̅0) = 92.5°; good on {001}
- Fracture: Conchoidal to uneven
- Mohs scale hardness: 5.5–6.5
- Luster: Vitreous to pearly
- Streak: White
- Diaphaneity: Transparent to translucent
- Specific gravity: 3.57–3.76
- Optical properties: Biaxial (+)
- Refractive index: n_{α} = 1.711–1.738, n_{β} = 1.714–1.741, n_{γ} = 1.724–1.751
- Birefringence: δ = 0.013
- Pleochroism: Weak
- 2V angle: 58° to 73° (measured), 58° (calculated)
- Alters to: Exterior commonly black from manganese oxides

Rhodonite is a manganese inosilicate, with the formula (Mn, Fe, Mg, Ca)SiO_{3}, and member of the pyroxenoid group of minerals, crystallizing in the triclinic system. The term rhodonite was first introduced by Germar. from Ancient Greek ῥόδον (rhódon) 'rose'. It commonly occurs as cleavable to compact masses with a rose-red color often tending to brown due to surface oxidation. The rose-red hue is caused by the manganese cation (Mn^{2+}).

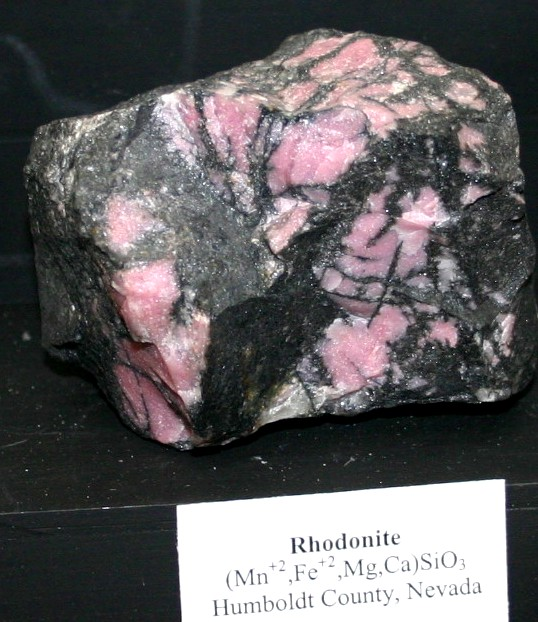
Pink rhodonite contrasting with black manganese oxides is sometimes used as gemstone material as seen in this specimen from Humboldt County, Nevada.

Rhodonite crystals often have a thick tabular habit, but are rare. It has a perfect, prismatic cleavage, almost at right angles. The hardness is 5.5–6.5, and the specific gravity is 3.4–3.7; luster is vitreous, being less frequently pearly on cleavage surfaces. The manganese is often partly replaced by iron, magnesium, calcium, and sometimes zinc, which may sometimes be present in considerable amounts; a greyish-brown variety containing as much as 20% of calcium oxide is called bustamite; fowlerite is a zinciferous variety containing 7% of zinc oxide.

The inosilicate (chain silicate) structure of rhodonite has a repeat unit of five silica tetrahedra. The rare polymorph pyroxmangite, formed at different conditions of pressure and temperature, has the same chemical composition but a repeat unit of seven tetrahedra.

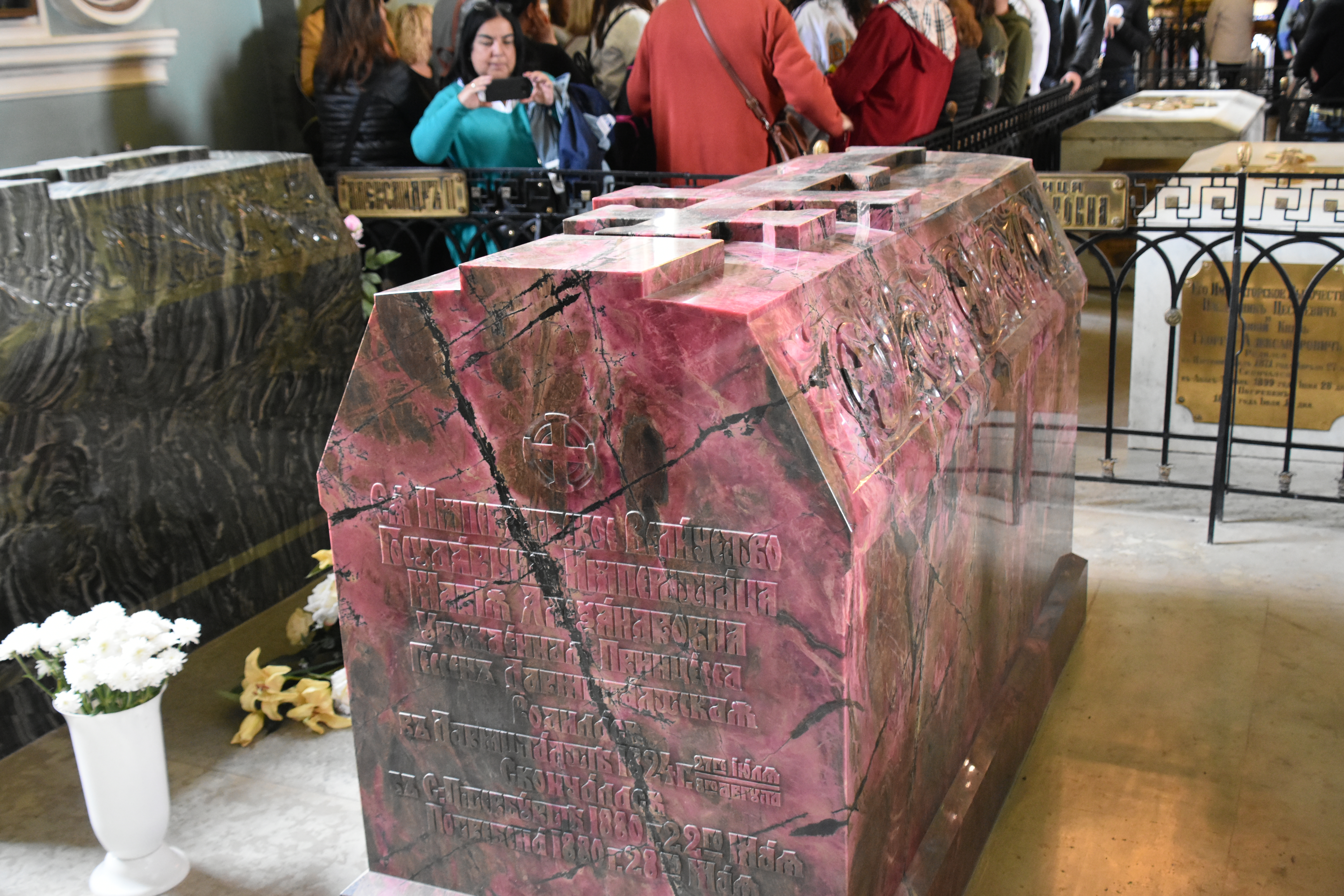
Tomb of Tsarina Maria Alexandrovna, wife, of Tsar Alexander II, Peter and Paul Cathedral

Rhodonite has also been worked as an ornamental stone. During the 19th century, the main rhodonite deposits exploited as ornamental stone were those located near Yekaterinburg, in the Urals. A block of material from this source was used to build the tomb of Tsarina Maria Alexandrovna, completed in 1906 and installed in the Peter and Paul Cathedral in St. Petersburg. When it occurs in massive form, rhodonite is usually associated with pyroxmanite. At the Serrana mine in El Molar (Tarragona), a material composed of a mixture of microgranular rhodonite and pyroxmanite has been extracted for use in the production of decorative slabs and cabochons. A very similar material is found in Tanatz Alp, Switzerland.

In the iron and manganese mines at Pajsberg near Filipstad and Långban in Värmland, Sweden, small brilliant and translucent crystals (pajsbergite) and cleavage masses occur. Fowlerite (a Zn- and Ca-bearing variety of rhodonite), occurs as large, rough crystals, somewhat resembling pink feldspar, with franklinite and zinc ores in granular limestone at Franklin Furnace in New Jersey.

Rhodonite is the official gemstone of the Commonwealth of Massachusetts.

== See also ==
- Enstatite, with MgSiO_{3} and FeSiO_{3} end-members
- Khondalite
- Wollastonite, CaSiO_{3}
