= List of crossings of the Wallkill River =

This is a list of the crossings of the Wallkill River (all bridges) from its mouth at Sturgeon Pool in Rifton, New York to its source at Lake Mohawk in Lake Mohawk, New Jersey.

== Crossings ==
Crossing	Carries	Location	Coordinates
=== New York ===
Perrine's Bridge	foot and bicycle traffic	Rosendale	41°49′04″N 74°03′20″W
	I-87 (New York State Thruway)	Rosendale	41°49′02″N 74°03′23″W
	NY 32/NY 213	Rosendale	41°48′52″N 74°03′32″W
Springtown Truss Bridge	Wallkill Valley Rail Trail	Town of New Paltz	41°46′35″N 74°05′23″W
Carmine Liberta Bridge	NY 299	Village of New Paltz	41°44′48″N 74°05′27″W
Tuthilltown Bridge	US 44/NY 55	Gardiner	41°41′15″N 74°09′58″W
	Galeville Road	Town of Shawangunk	41°38′07″N 74°11′19″W
	Bruyn Turnpike	Wallkill	41°36′21″N 74°11′12″W
Walden Low Bridge	Oak Street	Walden	41°33′49″N 74°11′36″W
Walden Veterans' Memorial Bridge (also Walden High Bridge)	NY 52 (West Main Street)	Walden	41°33′39″N 74°11′40″W
Ward's Bridge	NY 17K	Village of Montgomery	41°31′43″N 74°14′19″W
Bodine's Bridge	NY 211	Town of Montgomery	41°30′08″N 74°15′50″W
	I-84	Town of Montgomery	41°29′57″N 74°15′12″W
	Metro-North Port Jervis Line	Campbell Hall/Town of Wallkill	41°27′44″N 74°17′21″W
abandoned New York, Ontario and Western railroad bridge		Campbell Hall/Town of Wallkill	41°27′37″N 74°17′29″W
	Stony Ford Road, Long Path hiking trail	Campbell Hall/Town of Wallkill	41°27′26″N 74°18′03″W
	Scotchtown Road	Campbell Hall/Town of Wallkill	41°26′59″N 74°19′58″W
	NY 17	Town of Wallkill	41°26′24″N 74°21′39″W
	McVeigh Road	Goshen	41°24′41″N 74°22′41″W
	US 6/NY 17M	Goshen	41°24′06″N 74°23′24″W
	Cross Road	Goshen-Wawayanda	41°22′51″N 74°24′49″W
	Pine Island Road	Warwick-Wawayanda	41°18′53″N 74°29′26″W
	Oil City Road, Appalachian Trail	Warwick-Wawayanda	41°17′16″N 74°32′06″W
=== New Jersey ===
Bassetts Bridge	Bassetts Bridge Road	Vernon-Wantage	41°15′35″N 74°32′56″W
Abandoned Lehigh and New England Railroad bridge		Vernon-Wantage	41°12′40″N 74°34′17″W
	Sussex County 565	Vernon-Wantage	41°11′38″N 74°34′31″W
	NJ 23	Hardyston-Wantage	41°10′00″N 74°35′14″W
	NJ 94 (Ames Boulevard)	Hardyston-Hamburg	41°09′08″N 74°34′56″W
	Gingerbread Castle Road	Hamburg	41°08′45″N 74°34′39″W
	Scott Road	Franklin	41°07′59″N 74°34′44″W
	Susquehanna Street and North Church Street	Franklin	41°07′16″N 74°35′30″W
	New York, Susquehanna and Western Railway	Franklin	41°07′15″N 74°35′30″W
	Wildcat Road	Franklin	41°06′55″N 74°35′41″W
abandoned NYS&W bridge		Franklin	41°06′52″N 74°35′31″W
	Church Street	Franklin	41°06′52″N 74°35′28″W
	Franklin Avenue	Franklin	41°06′44″N 74°35′20″W
	Kennedy Avenue	Ogdensburg	41°05′13″N 74°35′42″W
Backwards Tunnel		Ogdensburg	41°05′09″N 74°36′05″W
	Passaic Avenue	Ogdensburg	41°05′06″N 74°36′08″W
	Bridge Street	Ogdensburg	41°04′54″N 74°36′08″W
	Brooks Flat Road	Ogdensburg	41°04′20″N 74°36′18″W
	West Mountain Road	Sparta	41°03′14″N 74°37′21″W
	Station Road	Sparta	41°02′50″N 74°37′36″W
	NYS&W	Sparta	41°02′45″N 74°37′43″W
	Station Road	Sparta	41°02′34″N 74°37′47″W
	Sussex County 517	Sparta	41°02′30″N 74°37′49″W
	Main Street	Sparta	41°02′30″N 74°37′48″W
	NJ 15	Sparta	41°02′26″N 74°37′47″W
	NJ 181	Sparta	41°02′07″N 74°38′15″W
	West Shore Trail	Sparta	41°02′00″N 74°38′35″W
