= Bodine =

Bodine may refer to:

== People ==
- A. Aubrey Bodine (1906–1970), American photographer and photojournalist
- Al Bodine (1927–2020), American football player in Canadian football
- Barbara Bodine (born 1948), American scholar and former diplomat
- Elizabeth Bodine (1898–1986), American humanitarian
- Frank L. Bodine (1874–after 1930), American architect
- Francis L. Bodine (1936–2023), American politician
- Janice M. Bodine, American politician in the Wyoming House of Representatives from 1991 to 1992
- Joseph Lamb Bodine (1883–1950), American district judge
- Robert N. Bodine (1837–1914), American politician
- Russell Bodine (born 1992), American football player
- Samuel L. Bodine (1900–1958), American politician
- Todd Bodine (born 1963), American football quarterback in Canadian football
- Walt Bodine (1920–2013), American broadcast journalist
- William Harold Bodine, Sr., three-time mayor of Teaneck, New Jersey, United States, at various times from 1915 to 1926
- Bodine family of race car drivers:
  - Geoff Bodine (born 1949), also notable as a bobsled builder
    - Barry Bodine (born 1977), son of Geoff, also a NASCAR driver
  - Brett Bodine (born 1959)
  - Eric Bodine (born 1962)
  - Todd Bodine (born 1964)
- Bodine Koehler (born 1992), Dutch-born Puerto Rican musician, model and beauty pageant winner

== Groups ==
- The Bodines, a British rock group from the mid- to late-1980s
- Bodine (band), a Dutch heavy metal band

== Fictional characters ==
- Jethro Bodine and Pearl Bodine, fictional hillbillies on The Beverly Hillbillies
- Pig Bodine, a fictional seaman created by Thomas Pynchon
- Tully Bodine, main character in the video game Loadstar: The Legend of Tully Bodine
- Duane "Dust Devil" Bodine, from the Top 10 comic book published by WildStorm, see List of Top 10 characters

== Other uses ==
- Bodine High School for International Affairs, Philadelphia, Pennsylvania, United States, on the National Register of Historic Places
- Bodine Creek, Port Richmond, Staten Island, New York, United States

== See also ==
- Bodine's Bridge, New York, United States
- Bodines Casino, Carson City, Nevada, United States
- Bodine Farmhouse, Walden, New York
- Metlar–Bodine House, Piscataway, New Jersey, United States
