= Ogden Mine Railroad =

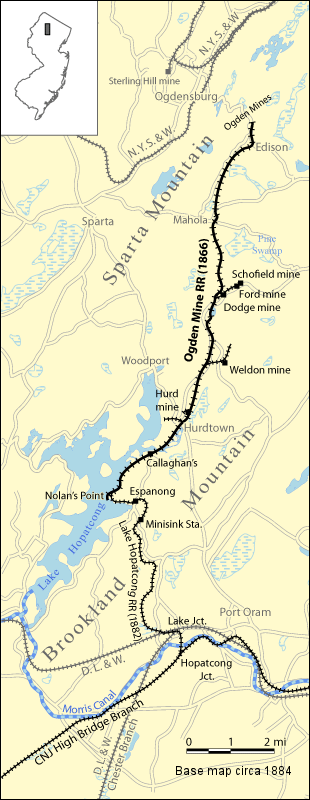
Ogden Mine Railroad

The Ogden Mine Railroad was a mine railroad in the U.S. state of New Jersey from 1866 until 1941.

== History ==
It was built in 1866 to transport iron ore from the mines on Sparta Mountain in New Jersey. Ore was carried to Nolan's Point on Lake Hopatcong, where it was loaded on barges and towed to the Morris Canal. Due to its dependence on water transport, the railroad only operated during the ice-free seasons.

The railroad also served the Dodge, Ford, Schofield, Weldon, and Hurd iron mines, located along the route from Sparta Mountain to Lake Hopatcong. For a few years, zinc ore from the Sterling Hill Mine in Ogdensburg was packed up a terraced road to the Ogden Mine, where it was transported by rail to the lake. In 1872, the New Jersey Midland (which became the New York, Susquehanna, and Western) extended its line to Ogdensburg and the zinc traffic on the Ogden Mine RR ceased.

Initially, the railroad had no connections to other lines. All equipment and materials were transported by barge to Nolan's Point, where the railroad machine shops were located. The railroad operated its own steamship to tow barges across the lake.

In 1881, the Central Railroad of New Jersey (CNJ) leased the Ogden Mine line for 999 years, paying 5% annually on the Ogden Mine capital stock. The CNJ created the Lake Hopatcong Railroad to connect the CNJ's High Bridge Branch line with the Ogden Mine terminus at Nolan's Point. The main obstacle to be overcome in construction was Brookland Mountain, which stood between Nolan's Point and the junction with the High Bridge branch. The line climbed from below 700 feet (213 m) at Lake Junction to 1,000 feet (305 m) just south of Minisink Road. In places the grade rose more than 4%, and some sections averaged 3%. By 1882, the connection was in operation and the Ogden Mine's dependence on the Morris Canal ended.

Iron ore traffic peaked in 1880 at about 100,000 short tons (89,000 long tons; 91,000 t) annually, then fell off as the Mesabi Range mines came into production. By the 1890s, the New Jersey iron mines were ceasing operations. The Edison Ore-Milling Company set up by Thomas Edison provided a brief revival when he constructed his experimental ore concentration plant at the Ogden mines, but his operation closed in 1900. During the ten years of the Edison plant's construction and operation, the railroad carried materials and a modest amount of the concentrated ore, but ore production never reached high levels.

Unexpectedly, weekend excursions to Lake Hopatcong provided substantial passenger traffic. Lake Hopatcong is New Jersey's largest lake, and city dwellers to the east were attracted to the lake's hotels and activities as a summer escape from the city. Passenger service started in 1883, and by 1888 the station at Nolan's Point was rebuilt to handle the estimated 50,000 visitors each summer during the 1890s.

In winter, icehouses cut ice from the lake and stored it in large warehouses along the shores, where it was later transported by the railroad. The traffic fell when prohibition curtailed demand for ice, and never recovered.

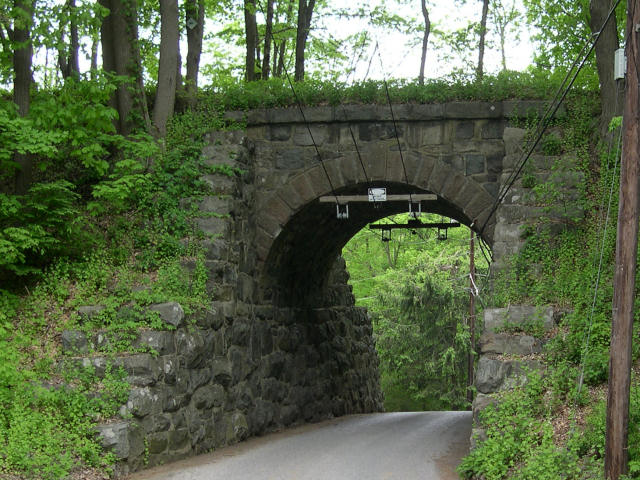
Ogden railroad viaduct at Milton Road

By the 1930s, the automobile had ended the excursion traffic, and with the iron mine and ice house closures, the railroad had little traffic. The CNJ abandoned the line and it was torn up in 1941 for iron to feed the war industry.

== Trails and traces ==
In Mount Arlington, south of the Minisink Road, the railbed is preserved as a trail in the Berkshire Valley Wildlife Management Area.

There is a raised railbed between Martin View Road and Mase Road parallel to Camille Drive. There is a stone bridge that was built to cross a stream. Local residents use this trail for recreation, although it is not part of the Berkshire Valley Wildlife Area. It has the local nickname "black tracks" due to the black ore spread on the railbed to prevent erosion.

The railbed between Minisink Road northward across Route 15 to Lake Shawnee has been obliterated by housing developments and highway improvements. The railbed north of Lake Shawnee is largely preserved as a trail in the Mahlon Dickerson Reservation, a Morris County park. North of the park one structure still stands, the stone viaduct over Milton Road near the former Mahola station. Traces of the line north of Mahola and Glen Road, ending at the former Edison works and abandoned Ogden Mines, are preserved in the Sparta Mountain Wildlife Management Area.
