= Carmine Liberta Bridge =

Bridge in New York, US

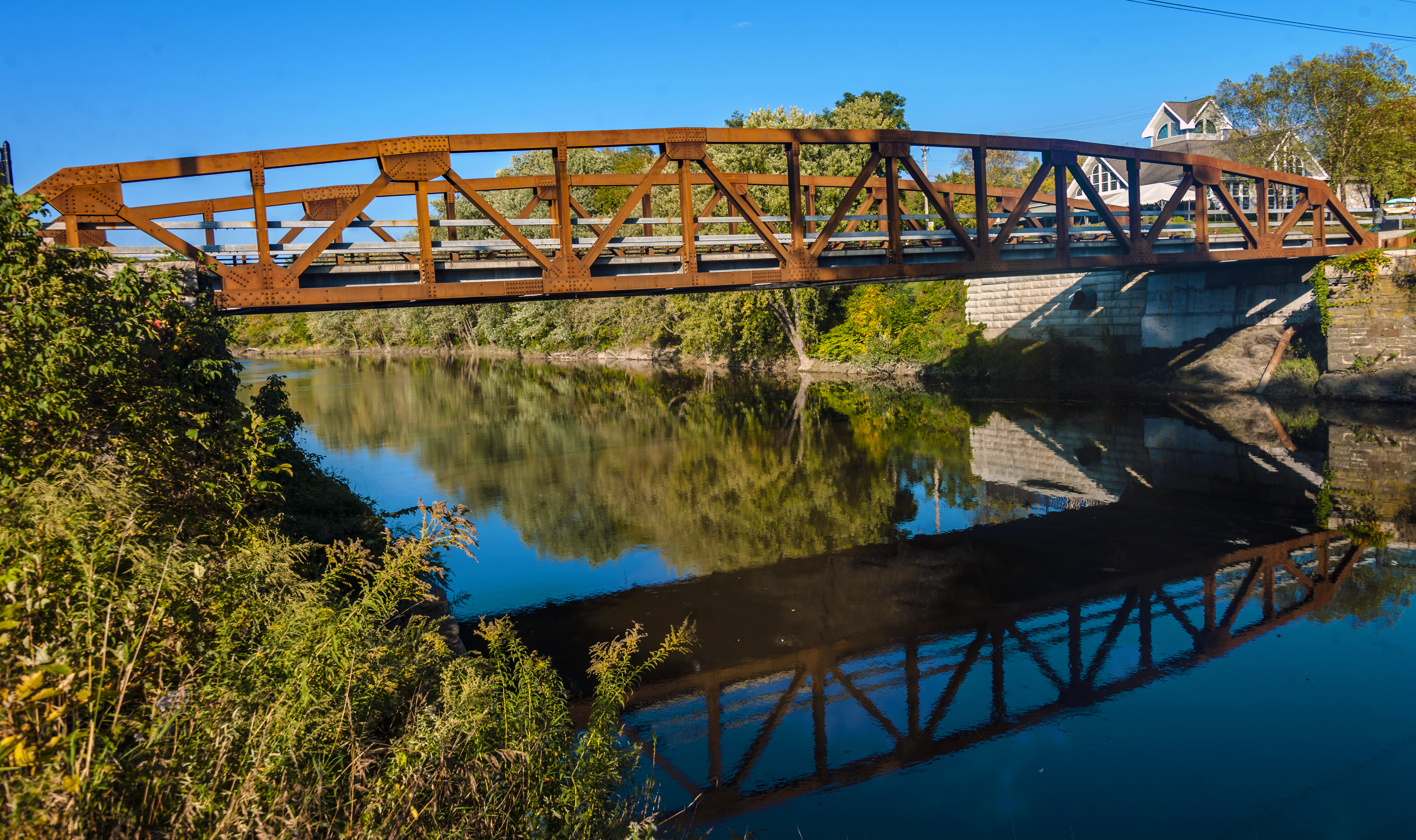
- Bridge seen from southwest, 2018
- Coordinates: 41°44′48″N 74°5′27″W
- Carries: NY 299
- Crosses: Wallkill River
- Locale: New Paltz, NY, USA
- Maintained by: Ulster County Highway Department
- ID number: 000000003045230
- Preceded by: Tuthilltown Bridge
- Followed by: Springtown Truss Bridge

Characteristics
- Design: Truss bridge
- Material: Weathering steel
- Total length: 175 feet (53 m)
- Width: 36 feet (11 m)
- No. of spans: 1
- Clearance above: 15 feet (4.6 m)

History
- Construction start: 2016
- Construction end: 2016

Statistics
- Daily traffic: 11649

Location
- Interactive map of Carmine Liberta Bridge

The Carmine Liberta Bridge is a two-lane steel through truss bridge over the Wallkill River. It carries New York State Route 299 over the river between the Town of New Paltz on the west side and the Village of New Paltz on the east. The current bridge, the fourth at that location, was built in 2016.

It is the only way into the village from that direction. As such, it often carries heavy traffic on weekends between New Paltz and the Shawangunk Ridge. Due to the flood plains on the western side it has been closed in periods of high water on the river.

== History ==
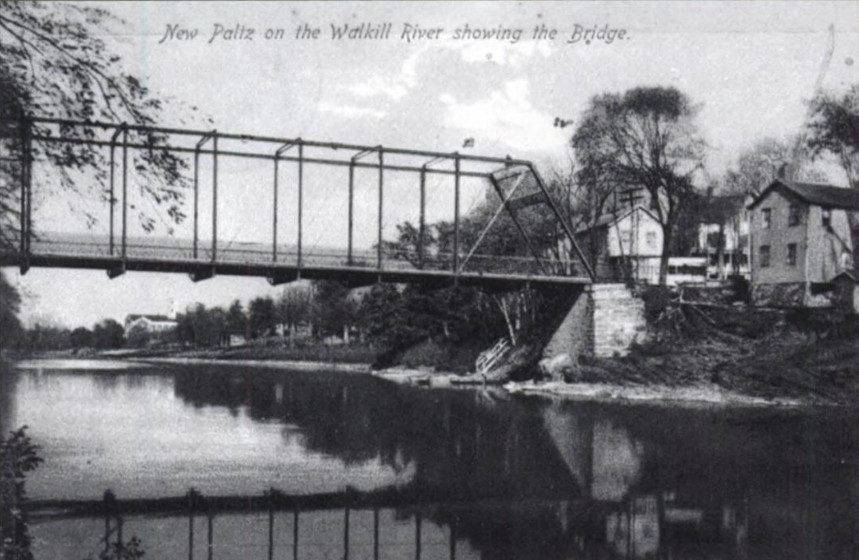
The second bridge in the mid-20th century.

Two other bridges had been built at the location of the Carmine Liberta Bridge: a wooden covered bridge, erected in 1845, and a 153-foot (47 m) iron bridge that had been built in 1891 at a cost of $677. The current bridge was built in 1940 and reconstructed half a century later, in 1990. In 2008 the Ulster County Legislature formally named it for Carmine Liberta, a lifelong resident and Korean War veteran who had been active in local veterans' affairs and served as vice chair of the town Republican committee for 25 years. Prior to its naming, the bridge was formally known as County Bridge No.135.

In 2016, with the bridge nearing the end of its useful life, the county demolished the 1940 bridge and replaced it with a new one, a truss of weathering steel with lower arches, no overhead members and a wider deck. On the north side a 6-foot-wide (1.8 m) lighted walkway for pedestrian and bicycle traffic was added, to better connect with bike routes and facilitate the River-to-Ridge Trail, a planned hiking route between the Hudson River and the Shawangunk Ridge. To take advantage of an improved view of the ridge created by the lower bridge and cleared trees necessary for building a temporary replacement bridge during construction, an observation deck was built on the north side of Route 299 just east of the bridge.

Following five months of construction at a cost of $2.4 million, the new bridge was formally opened and rededicated at the end of 2016. Ulster County Executive Mike Hein cut the ribbon, along with Carmine Liberta's widow Angie. He praised the project as "creating a waterfront in New Paltz for the first time since the 1600s."

== See also ==
- List of crossings of the Wallkill River

== Bibliography ==
- Johnson, Carol A.; Ryan, Marion W. (2001). New Paltz. Charleston, SC: Arcadia Publishing. ISBN 0-7385-0873-X.
