= Jeffersonite =

Pyroxene mineral

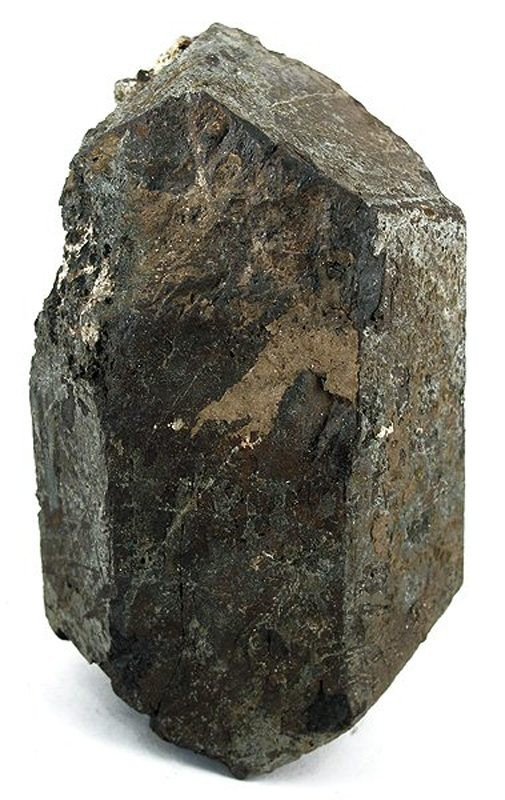
Jeffersonite from Sterling Hill, Franklin, New Jersey

Jeffersonite is a dark green pyroxene mineral, a manganese zinc enriched variety of augite, chemical formula Ca(Mn,Zn,Fe)Si_{2}O_{6}, sometimes compared to aegirine. Jeffersonite is not a recognized mineral name.

It occurs in pegmatites where it can form crystals up to 30 cm (12 in) long and in the contact metamorphic zone between limestone and various intrusive rocks. It is reported from the Sterling Hill Mine (Franklin, New Jersey), and from South Australia and Sweden.
