= Backwards Tunnel =

- U.S. National Register of Historic Places
- New Jersey Register of Historic Places
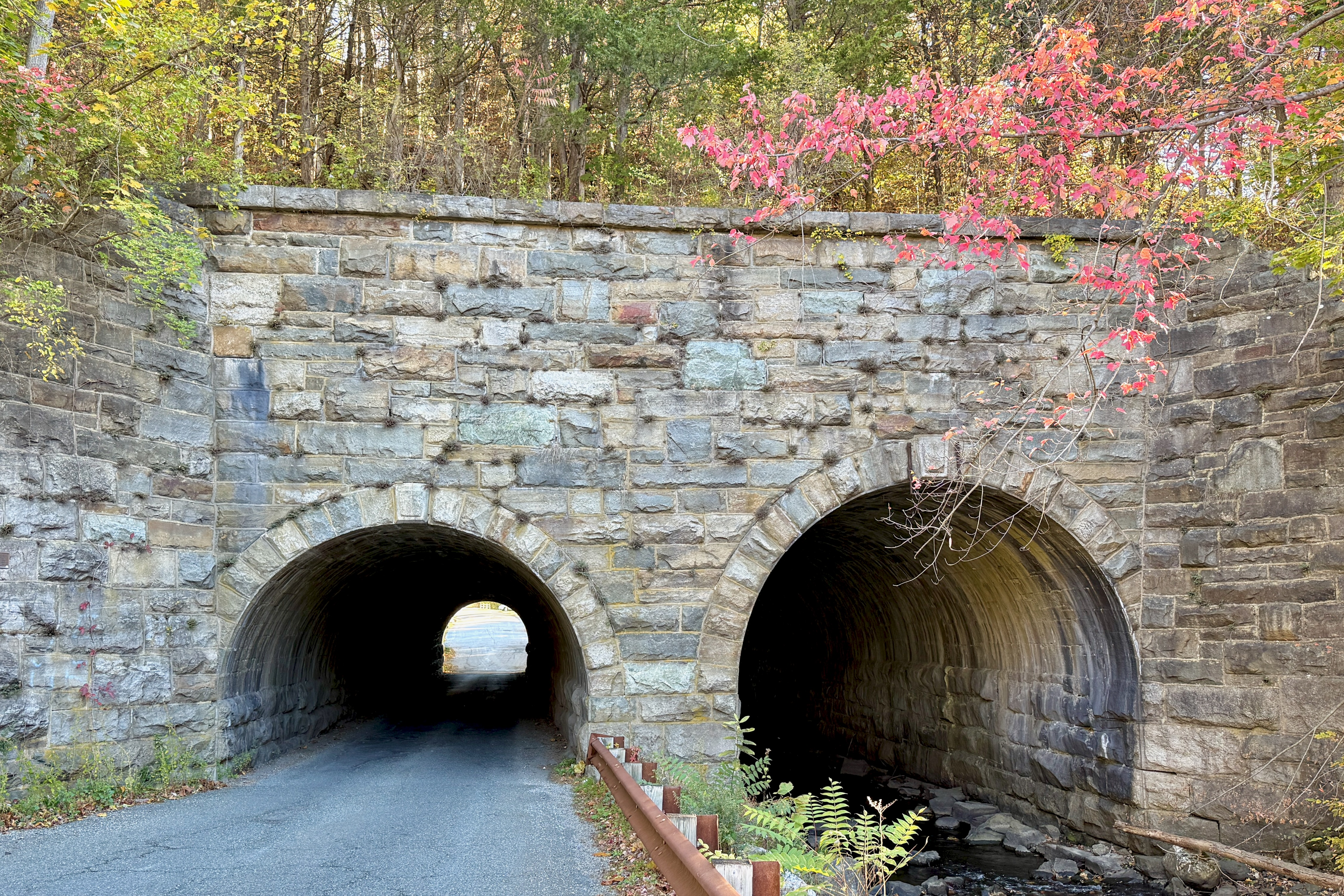
- View through south portals, 2025

- Location within Sussex County, New Jersey Location within New Jersey Location within the United States
- Location: Cork Hill Road, 310 feet North of Passaic Avenue intersection, Ogdensburg, New Jersey
- Coordinates: 41°05′09″N 74°36′06″W
- Area: 0.6 acres (0.24 ha)
- Built: 1871
- Architect: Arnold, Justin; Mr. Simpson
- Architectural style: Double Stone Arch
- NRHP reference No.: 05001483
- NJRHP No.: 4305

Significant dates
- Added to NRHP: December 28, 2005
- Designated NJRHP: September 12, 2005

Backwards Tunnel, also known as the Ogdensburg Railroad Arch, is located in Ogdensburg, Sussex County, New Jersey, United States. The tunnel was added to the National Register of Historic Places on December 28, 2005.

== History ==
The tunnel was built in 1871 by the New Jersey Midland Railway in order to cross the Wallkill Valley. New York, Susquehanna and Western Railway took over control of the tunnel in 1881 when the Midland Railway Line was merged into it. The tunnel was first referenced as the Backwards Tunnel in 1976 because it was thought that the tunnel should have been wider over the road than over the river. Ogdensburg declared the tunnel a borough historic site in 1991. A flood in 2000 which caused two nearby dams to burst damaged the tunnel. A book was published in 2009 about the history of the tunnel.

== Design ==
The tunnel is a double stone arch design and is a 180 feet long. The one arch which Cork Hill Road runs through measures 16 feet wide and 15 feet tall. The other arch which the Wallkill River flows through measures 20 wide and 16 feet tall. The rail line ran on top of the tunnel.

== See also ==
- List of crossings of the Wallkill River
- National Register of Historic Places listings in Sussex County, New Jersey
- List of bridges on the National Register of Historic Places in New Jersey
- Sterling Hill Mining Museum, located nearby the tunnel and also on the National Register of Historic Places.
