= Bodine Farmhouse =

Historic house in New York, United States

- U.S. National Register of Historic Places
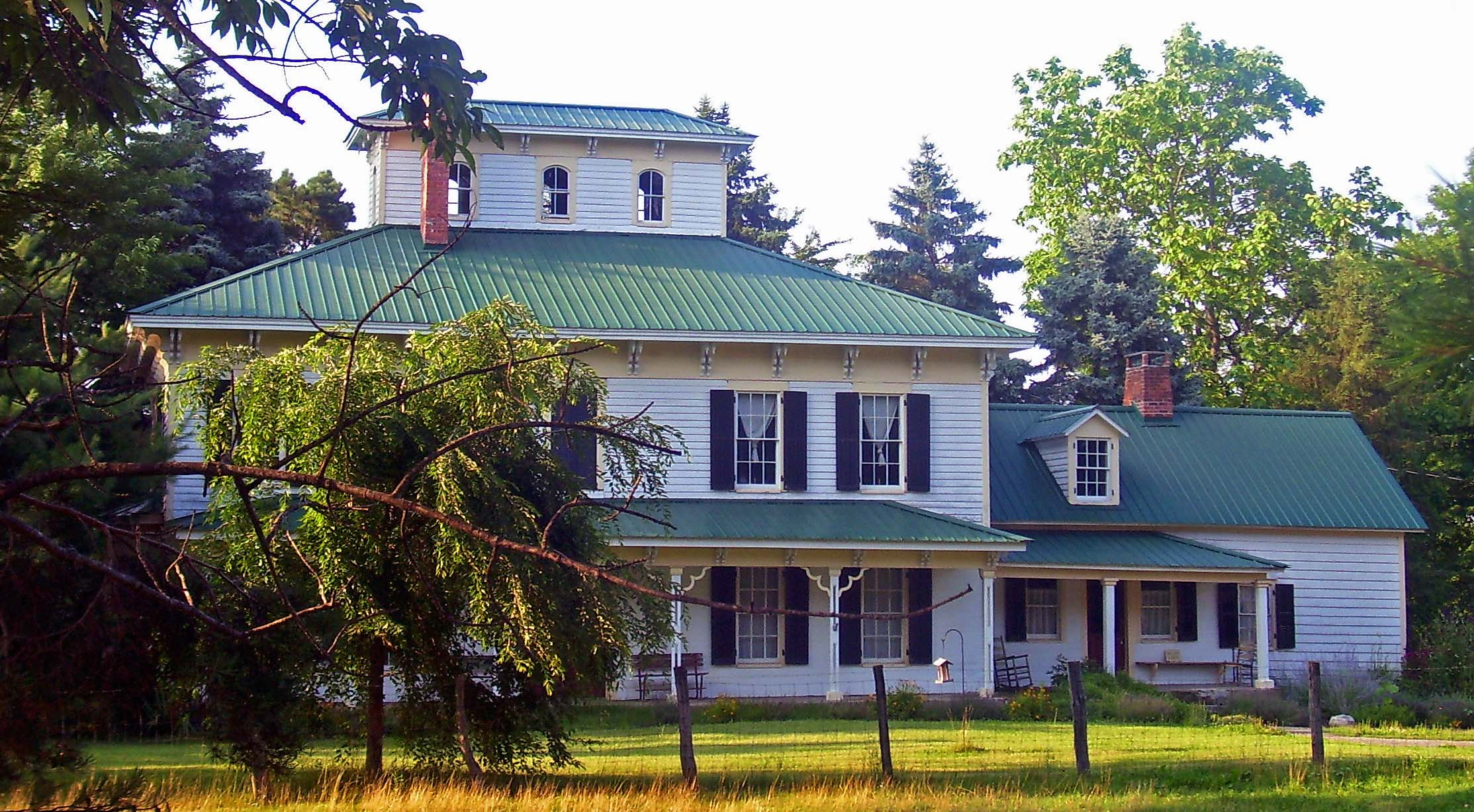
- The house in 2007
- Location: Town of Montgomery, NY
- Nearest city: Newburgh
- Coordinates: 41°34′25″N 74°11′50″W
- Area: 9.7 acres (3.9 ha)
- NRHP reference No.: 06000334
- Added to NRHP: 2006

The Bodine Farmhouse is located on Wallkill Road just outside the village of Walden in the Town of Montgomery, Orange County, New York, United States. It was added to the National Register of Historic Places in 2006.

It is currently a private residence.

== History ==
The Bodine Farmstead was possibly built in 1769 by William Bodine, the grandson of Jean Bodine, but the record of his birth has not been found. He was granted a large tract of land of over 3,000 acres (12 km^{2}) in the Town of Montgomery, outside the village of Walden, and his homestead was built in 1769 and occupied by several generations of his descendants. The last was Hillah Terbell in about 1908.

Bodine was a distant relative of Jean Bodin, a Renaissance philosopher of France.
