= Edison Ore-Milling Company =

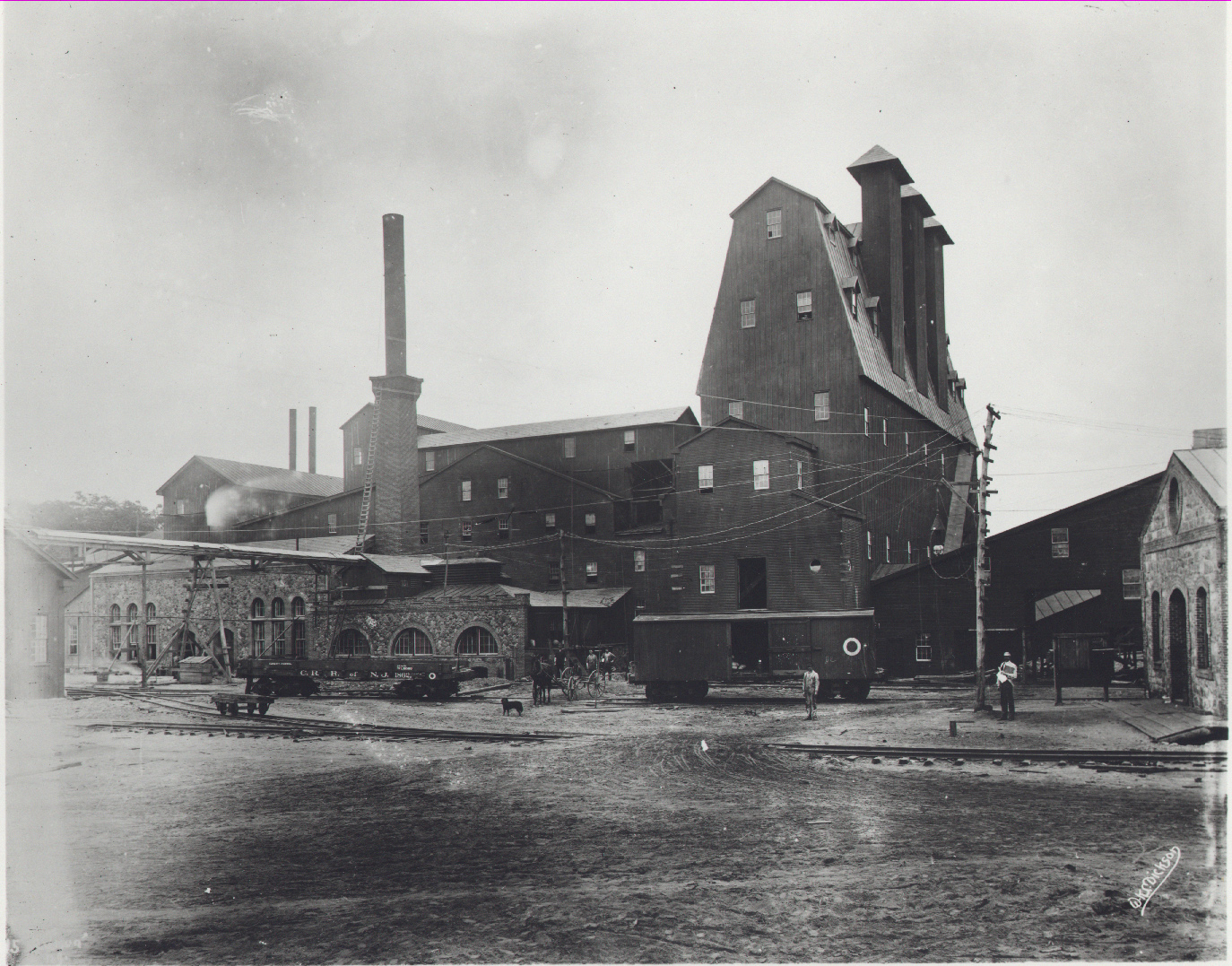
- An Edison plant in Ogdensburg, New Jersey (c. 1895)
- Industry: Mining
- Founded: 1880; 146 years ago
- Founder: Thomas Edison
- Defunct: 1899
- Products: Iron ore

The Edison Ore-Milling Company was a venture by Thomas Edison that began in 1880. Edison introduced some significant technological developments to the iron ore milling industry but the company ultimately proved to be unprofitable. Towards the end of the company's life, Edison realized the potential application of his technologies to the cement industry and formed the Edison Portland Cement Company in 1899.

== History ==
=== Beginnings ===
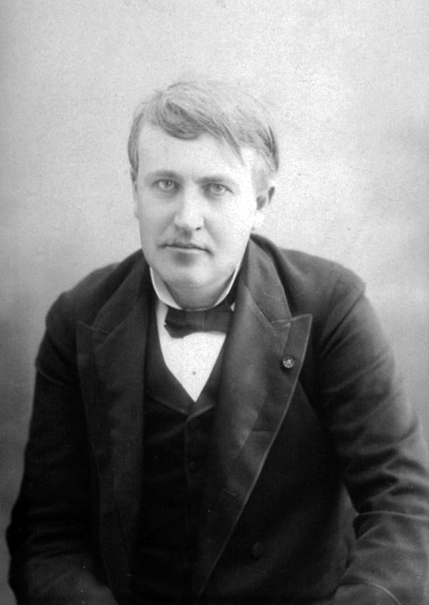
Photograph of Thomas Edison by Victor Daireaux, Paris, c. 1880s

Edison had recognized the scarcity of iron ore in the 1870s, particularly in the east of the United States. His developments in the field of electricity meant that he had sufficient finances to invest in other projects. Discovering that beach sand contained relatively high deposits of iron, he decided to form the Edison Ore-Milling Company in 1880. He patented a method of extracting the metal using a large electromagnet after developing the process in an addition to his laboratory. The remaining deposits of iron in the eastern side of the United States were of poor quality, and the difficulty in separating it from the rock and other debris made it unprofitable. Edison believed that his method was a cheaper alternative, allowing him to keep costs down. William Kennedy Dickson had been put in charge of much of the laboratory and further refined the techniques along with mining expert John Birkinbine. However, Edison's iron was competing with the rich iron ore of the Iron Range and sales were not sufficient to bring in a profit and the operation was closed down after just a few years.

Edison operated an iron mine in the Franklin-Sterling Hill Mining District near Ogdensburg, New Jersey under the New Jersey and Pennsylvania Concentrating Co. The Edison mine exploited a large low-grade magnetite deposit which had been mined since the 1770s, which Edison and his engineers ground and concentrated.

=== Refocusing ===
After a short time away from the industry, Edison decided to return, adapting his methods to crush rocks brought up directly from a mine. He opened a plant in Bechtelsville, Pennsylvania near to existing iron mines as a trial before building one of the world's largest ore-crushing mills in the world at the time in Ogdensburg, New Jersey. Completed in 1889, the factory contained three giant electromagnets and was intended to process up to 1200 tons of iron ore every day. This mill pulverized the large chunks of ore that came directly from the mine. There was other equipment to re-refine what was left over to extract even more ore. However, technical difficulties repeatedly thwarted production.

Edison formed the Edison General Electric Company in 1890 but it only lasted two years, merging in 1892 with the Thomson-Houston Electric Company to form the General Electric Company. He redirected his interest back to iron ore, having high hopes for what he could achieve: "I'm going to do something now so different and so much bigger than anything I've ever done before people will forget that my name ever was connected with anything electrical."

That year, he closed the Ogdensburg plant for upgrades, using the sale of stocks in General Electric to install new equipment that would be able to output even more iron ore. He made changes to the ore-crushing machinery, installing huge rollers capable of turning out much larger quantities of ore. When it reopened, the earlier problems persisted and Edison once again had difficulties finding customers.

=== Sale and a change of industry ===
Eventually, Edison realized that the company was a failure, shutting it down in 1899. Edison commented about the financial losses, "it's all gone, but we had a hell of a good time spending it."

The manufacturing process produced a large quantity of waste sand, which the company sold on to cement manufacturers. The properties of the sand were particularly suitable for cement, leading to a harder, more durable product. Selling off the ore-crushing technology to mine owners, Edison decided to switch to the cement business, reusing some of the technology he had developed for ore-milling.

== Bibliography ==
- Baldwin, Neil (1995). Edison: Inventing the Century. Hyperion. ISBN 978-0-226-03571-0.

== See also ==
- List of Edison patents
- Edison Portland Cement Company
