= Janice M. Bodine =

American politician (1937–2005)

Member of the Wyoming House of Representatives from the Uinta district
- In office 1991–1992

Personal details
- Party: Republican

Janice M. Bodine (August 29, 1937 – April 13, 2005) was an American Republican politician from Evanston, Wyoming. She represented the Uinta district in the Wyoming House of Representatives from 1991 to 1992.

Bodie was born Janice M. Bills in Rifle, Colorado, on August 29, 1937.

Bodine died in Evanston on April 13, 2005, at the age of 67.
