= Ogdensburg, New Jersey =

Borough in Sussex County, New Jersey, US

- Borough
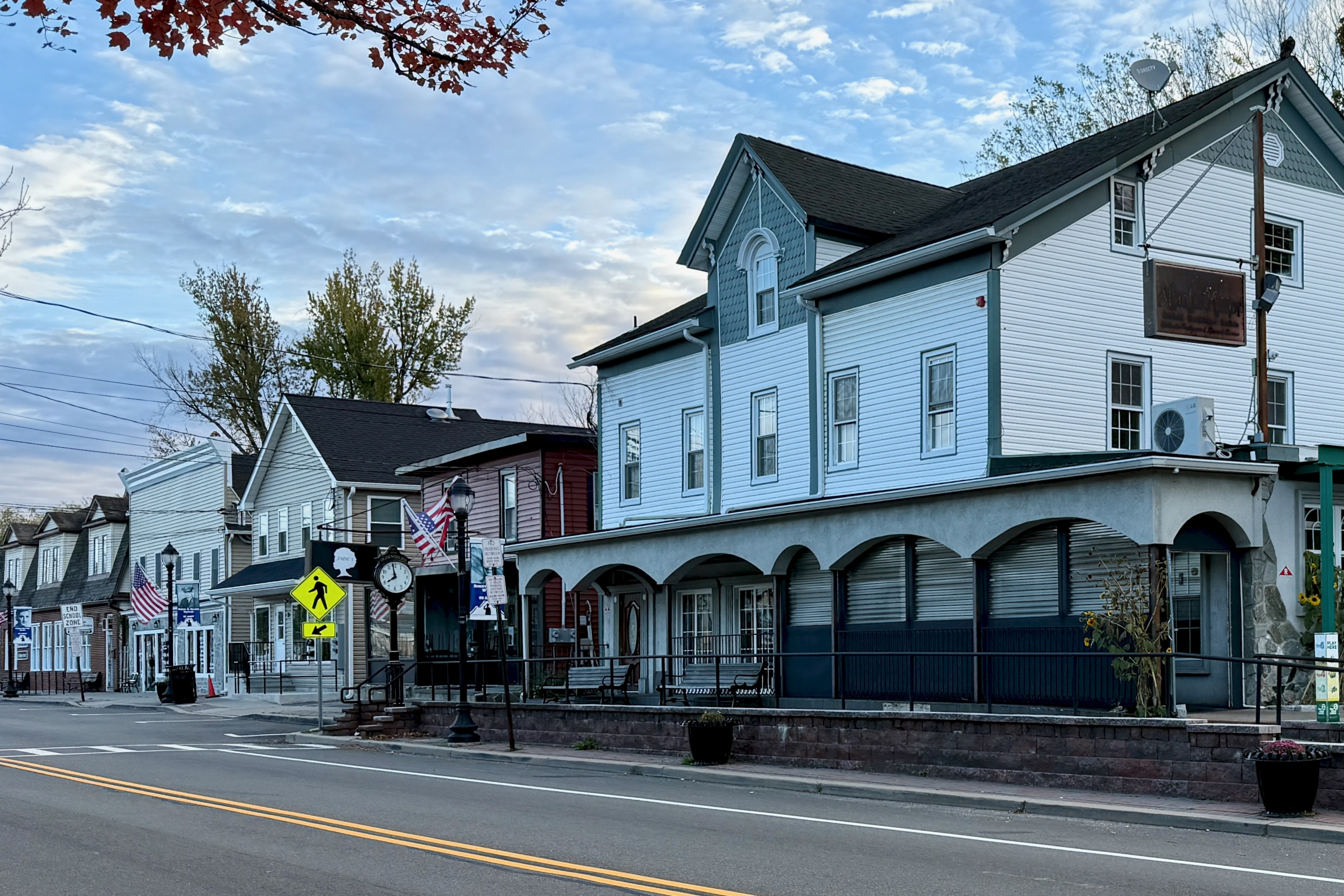
- Main Street, Ogdensburg

- Seal

- Map of Ogdensburg in Sussex County. Inset: Location of Sussex County in New Jersey.

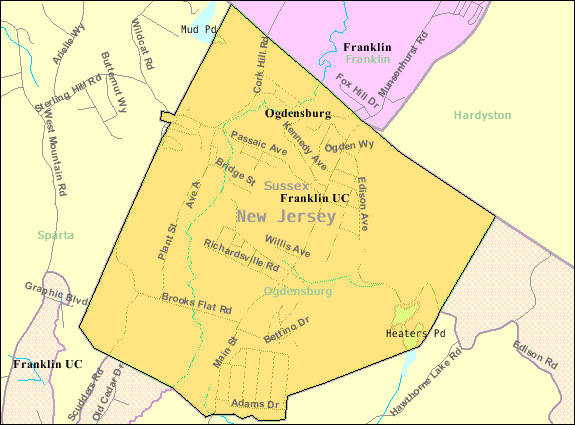
- Census Bureau map of Ogdensburg, New Jersey

- Location in Sussex County Location in New Jersey Location in the United States
- Coordinates: 41.08009°N 74.597626°W
- Country: United States
- State: New Jersey
- County: Sussex
- Incorporated: March 31, 1914

Government
  - Type: Borough
  - Body: Borough Council
  - Mayor: George P. Hutnick (R, term ends December 31, 2026)
  - Municipal clerk: Robin Hough

Area
  - Total: 2.25 sq mi (5.82 km^{2})
  - Land: 2.20 sq mi (5.71 km^{2})
  - Water: 0.042 sq mi (0.11 km^{2}) 1.96%
  - Rank: 391st of 565 in state 19th of 24 in county
- Elevation: 591 ft (180 m)

Population (2020)
  - Total: 2,258
  - Estimate (2023): 2,293
  - Rank: 477th of 565 in state 19th of 24 in county
  - Density: 1,024.7/sq mi (395.6/km^{2})
  - Rank: 381st of 565 in state 8th of 24 in county
- Time zone: UTC−05:00 (Eastern (EST))
  - Summer (DST): UTC−04:00 (Eastern (EDT))
- ZIP Code: 07439
- Area code: 973 exchanges: 209, 823, 827
- FIPS code: 3403754660
- GNIS feature ID: 0885335
- Website: www.ogdensburgnj.org

Ogdensburg is a borough in Sussex County, in the U.S. state of New Jersey. As of the 2020 United States census, the borough's population was 2,258, a decrease of 152 (−6.3%) from the 2010 census count of 2,410, which in turn reflected a decline of 228 (−8.6%) from the 2,638 counted in the 2000 census.

The borough was formed based on an Act of the New Jersey Legislature on February 26, 1914, from part of Sparta Township, subject to the results of a referendum held on March 31, 1914. Ogdensburg is named after its first settler, Robert Ogden.

New Jersey Monthly magazine ranked Ogdensburg as its 27th best place to live in its 2008 rankings of the "Best Places To Live" in New Jersey.

== Geography ==
According to the United States Census Bureau, the borough had a total area of 2.25 square miles (5.82 km^{2}), including 2.20 square miles (5.71 km^{2}) of land and 0.04 square miles (0.11 km^{2}) of water (1.96%).

Unincorporated communities, localities and place names located partially or completely within the borough include Heaters Pond, South Ogdensburg and Sterling Hill.

Ogdensburg borders the Sussex County municipalities of Franklin, Hardyston Township and Sparta Township.

Ogdensburgite, an arsenate mineral, was named after the borough.

== Demographics ==
Historical population
Census	Pop.	Note	%±
1920	939		—
1930	1,138		21.2%
1940	1,165		2.4%
1950	1,169		0.3%
1960	1,212		3.7%
1970	2,222		83.3%
1980	2,737		23.2%
1990	2,722		−0.5%
2000	2,638		−3.1%
2010	2,410		−8.6%
2020	2,258		−6.3%
2023 (est.)	2,293	▲	1.6%
Population sources: 1920 1920–1930; 1940–2000 2000; 2010 2020

=== 2020 census ===
As of the 2020 census, Ogdensburg had a population of 2,258. The median age was 42.4 years. 18.6% of residents were under the age of 18 and 16.6% of residents were 65 years of age or older. For every 100 females there were 100.2 males, and for every 100 females age 18 and over there were 99.7 males age 18 and over.

90.0% of residents lived in urban areas, while 10.0% lived in rural areas.

There were 873 households in Ogdensburg, of which 29.8% had children under the age of 18 living in them. Of all households, 54.5% were married-couple households, 17.2% were households with a male householder and no spouse or partner present, and 19.6% were households with a female householder and no spouse or partner present. About 20.8% of all households were made up of individuals and 10.9% had someone living alone who was 65 years of age or older.

There were 927 housing units, of which 5.8% were vacant. The homeowner vacancy rate was 3.6% and the rental vacancy rate was 4.0%.

Racial composition as of the 2020 census
Race	Number	Percent
White	1,913	84.7%
Black or African American	24	1.1%
American Indian and Alaska Native	5	0.2%
Asian	30	1.3%
Native Hawaiian and Other Pacific Islander	0	0.0%
Some other race	78	3.5%
Two or more races	208	9.2%
Hispanic or Latino (of any race)	265	11.7%

=== 2010 census ===
The 2010 United States census counted 2,410 people, 864 households, and 681 families in the borough. The population density was 1,055.4 per square mile (407.5/km^{2}). There were 905 housing units at an average density of 396.3 per square mile (153.0/km^{2}). The racial makeup was 95.23% (2,295) White, 0.33% (8) Black or African American, 0.04% (1) Native American, 1.83% (44) Asian, 0.17% (4) Pacific Islander, 1.00% (24) from other races, and 1.41% (34) from two or more races. Hispanic or Latino of any race were 6.27% (151) of the population.

Of the 864 households, 34.3% had children under the age of 18; 63.8% were married couples living together; 10.3% had a female householder with no husband present and 21.2% were non-families. Of all households, 17.6% were made up of individuals and 6.7% had someone living alone who was 65 years of age or older. The average household size was 2.79 and the average family size was 3.17.

24.5% of the population were under the age of 18, 7.6% from 18 to 24, 25.8% from 25 to 44, 30.7% from 45 to 64, and 11.4% who were 65 years of age or older. The median age was 40.6 years. For every 100 females, the population had 101.0 males. For every 100 females ages 18 and older there were 97.4 males.

The Census Bureau's 2006–2010 American Community Survey showed that (in 2010 inflation-adjusted dollars) median household income was $78,333 (with a margin of error of +/− $11,582) and the median family income was $87,656 (+/− $10,522). Males had a median income of $66,860 (+/− $3,252) versus $41,900 (+/− $6,659) for females. The per capita income for the borough was $29,447 (+/− $3,151). About 10.2% of families and 8.5% of the population were below the poverty line, including 8.0% of those under age 18 and 14.0% of those age 65 or over.

=== 2000 census ===
As of the 2000 United States census there were 2,638 people, 881 households, and 704 families residing in the borough. The population density was 1,154.7 inhabitants per square mile (445.8/km^{2}). There were 903 housing units at an average density of 395.3 per square mile (152.6/km^{2}). The racial makeup of the borough was 97.54% White, 0.15% African American, 0.04% Native American, 0.72% Asian, 0.27% from other races, and 1.29% from two or more races. Hispanic or Latino of any race were 4.17% of the population.

There were 881 households, out of which 43.0% had children under the age of 18 living with them, 66.6% were married couples living together, 9.3% had a female householder with no husband present, and 20.0% were non-families. 16.6% of all households were made up of individuals, and 5.9% had someone living alone who was 65 years of age or older. The average household size was 2.99 and the average family size was 3.38.

In the borough the population was spread out, with 29.5% under the age of 18, 7.5% from 18 to 24, 31.0% from 25 to 44, 23.9% from 45 to 64, and 8.0% who were 65 years of age or older. The median age was 35 years. For every 100 females, there were 102.5 males. For every 100 females age 18 and over, there were 98.9 males.

The median income for a household in the borough was $60,313, and the median income for a family was $70,521. Males had a median income of $47,350 versus $35,060 for females. The per capita income for the borough was $24,305. About 4.8% of families and 5.7% of the population were below the poverty line, including 9.6% of those under age 18 and 7.1% of those age 65 or over.

== Government ==
=== Local government ===
Ogdensburg is governed under the borough form of New Jersey municipal government, which is used in 218 municipalities (of the 564) statewide, making it the most common form of government in New Jersey. The governing body is comprised of the mayor and the borough council, with all positions elected at-large on a partisan basis as part of the November general election. The mayor is elected directly by the voters to a four-year term of office. The borough council includes six members elected to serve three-year terms on a staggered basis, with two seats coming up for election each year in a three-year cycle. The borough form of government used by Ogdensburg is a "weak mayor / strong council" government in which council members act as the legislative body with the mayor presiding at meetings and voting only in the event of a tie. The mayor can veto ordinances subject to an override by a two-thirds majority vote of the council. The mayor makes committee and liaison assignments for council members, and most appointments are made by the mayor with the advice and consent of the council.

As of 2024, the mayor of Ogdensburg Borough is Republican George P. Hutnick, whose term of office ends December 31, 2026. Members of the Ogdenburg Borough Council are Council President Alfonse A. DeMeo (R, 2026), Nelson R. Alvarez (R, 2024), Steven Ciasullo (R, 2026), Brenda Cowdrick (R, 2025), Kenneth Poyer (R, 2024) and Caren Ruitenberg (R, 2025).

In June 2019, Nelson Alvarez was appointed to fill the seat expiring in December 2021 that had been held by David Astor. In the November 2019 general election, Alavarez was elected to serve the balance of the term of office.

In December 2019, Juan Cruz was appointed to fill the balance of the term expiring in December 2020 that had been held by Peter G. Opilla until he left office.

=== Federal, state, and county representation ===
Ogdensburg is located in the 7th Congressional District and is part of New Jersey's 24th state legislative district.

For the 119th United States Congress, New Jersey's 7th congressional district is represented by Thomas Kean Jr. (R, Westfield). New Jersey is represented in the United States Senate by Democrats Cory Booker (Newark, term ends 2027) and Andy Kim (Moorestown, term ends 2031).

For the 2026–2027 session, the 24th legislative district of the New Jersey Legislature is represented in the State Senate by Parker Space (R, Wantage Township) and in the General Assembly by Dawn Fantasia (R, Franklin) and Mike Inganamort (R, Chester Township).

Sussex County is governed by a Board of County Commissioners whose five members are elected at-large in partisan elections on a staggered basis, with either one or two seats coming up for election each year. At an annual reorganization meeting held in the beginning of January, the board selects a Commissioner Director and Deputy Director from among its members, with day-to-day supervision of the operation of the county delegated to a County Administrator. As of 2025, Sussex County's Commissioners are Director Jill Space (R, Wantage Township, 2025), Deputy Director Chris Carney (R, Frankford Township, 2027), Jack DeGroot (R, Sussex, 2026), William Hayden (I, Branchville, 2025) and Alan Henderson (R, Lafayette Township, 2027).

Constitutional officers elected on a countywide basis are Clerk Jeffrey M. Parrott (R, Wantage Township, 2026), Sheriff Michael F. Strada (R, Hampton Township, 2025) and Surrogate Gary R. Chiusano (R, Frankford Township, 2028).

=== Politics ===
As of March 2011, there were a total of 1,634 registered voters in Ogdenburg, of which 311 (19.0% vs. 16.5% countywide) were registered as Democrats, 564 (34.5% vs. 39.3%) were registered as Republicans and 757 (46.3% vs. 44.1%) were registered as Unaffiliated. There were 2 voters registered as either Libertarians or Greens. Among the borough's 2010 Census population, 67.8% (vs. 65.8% in Sussex County) were registered to vote, including 89.8% of those ages 18 and over (vs. 86.5% countywide).

Gubernatorial election results for Ogdensburg
Year	Republican		Democratic		Third party(ies)	
Year	No.	%	No.	%	No.	%
2025	577	58.05%	409	41.15%	8	0.80%
2021	595	70.25%	241	28.45%	11	1.30%
2017	400	60.42%	223	33.69%	39	5.89%
2013	520	71.92%	187	25.86%	16	2.21%
2009	491	64.52%	191	25.10%	79	10.38%
2005	403	59.18%	236	34.65%	42	6.17%

In the 2012 presidential election, Republican Mitt Romney received 636 votes (56.4% vs. 59.4% countywide), ahead of Democrat Barack Obama with 463 votes (41.1% vs. 38.2%) and other candidates with 24 votes (2.1% vs. 2.1%), among the 1,127 ballots cast by the borough's 1,616 registered voters, for a turnout of 69.7% (vs. 68.3% in Sussex County). In the 2008 presidential election, Republican John McCain received 709 votes (57.5% vs. 59.2% countywide), ahead of Democrat Barack Obama with 483 votes (39.2% vs. 38.7%) and other candidates with 25 votes (2.0% vs. 1.5%), among the 1,233 ballots cast by the borough's 1,622 registered voters, for a turnout of 76.0% (vs. 76.9% in Sussex County). In the 2004 presidential election, Republican George W. Bush received 728 votes (64.3% vs. 63.9% countywide), ahead of Democrat John Kerry with 378 votes (33.4% vs. 34.4%) and other candidates with 21 votes (1.9% vs. 1.3%), among the 1,132 ballots cast by the borough's 1,513 registered voters, for a turnout of 74.8% (vs. 77.7% in the whole county).

United States presidential election results for Ogdensburg 2024 2020 2016 2012 2008 2004
Year	Republican		Democratic		Third party(ies)	
Year	No.	%	No.	%	No.	%
2024	821	62.01%	474	35.80%	29	2.19%
2020	808	59.41%	519	38.16%	33	2.43%
2016	744	65.03%	351	30.68%	49	4.28%
2012	636	56.63%	463	41.23%	24	2.14%
2008	709	58.26%	483	39.69%	25	2.05%
2004	728	64.60%	378	33.54%	21	1.86%

In the 2013 gubernatorial election, Republican Chris Christie received 71.9% of the vote (520 cast), ahead of Democrat Barbara Buono with 25.9% (187 votes), and other candidates with 2.2% (16 votes), among the 731 ballots cast by the borough's 1,594 registered voters (8 ballots were spoiled), for a turnout of 45.9%. In the 2009 gubernatorial election, Republican Chris Christie received 491 votes (63.8% vs. 63.3% countywide), ahead of Democrat Jon Corzine with 191 votes (24.8% vs. 25.7%), Independent Chris Daggett with 71 votes (9.2% vs. 9.1%) and other candidates with 8 votes (1.0% vs. 1.3%), among the 770 ballots cast by the borough's 1,585 registered voters, yielding a 48.6% turnout (vs. 52.3% in the county).

United States Senate election results for Ogdensburg1
Year	Republican		Democratic		Third party(ies)	
Year	No.	%	No.	%	No.	%
2024	758	59.69%	469	36.93%	43	3.39%
2018	571	60.55%	308	32.66%	64	6.79%
2012	605	55.35%	442	40.44%	46	4.21%
2006	508	60.12%	295	34.91%	42	4.97%

United States Senate election results for Ogdensburg2
Year	Republican		Democratic		Third party(ies)	
Year	No.	%	No.	%	No.	%
2020	764	57.27%	526	39.43%	44	3.30%
2014	338	61.57%	194	35.34%	17	3.10%
2013	279	67.23%	131	31.57%	5	1.20%
2008	649	54.77%	489	41.27%	47	3.97%

== Education ==
The Ogdensburg Borough School District serves students in public school for pre-kindergarten through eighth grade at Ogdensburg School. As of the 2018–19 school year, the district, comprised of one school, had an enrollment of 236 students and 23.5 classroom teachers (on an FTE basis), for a student–teacher ratio of 10.0:1.

For ninth through twelfth grades, public school students attend Wallkill Valley Regional High School which also serves students from Franklin Borough, Hardyston Township and Hamburg Borough, and is part of the Wallkill Valley Regional High School District. As of the 2018–19 school year, the high school had an enrollment of 604 students and 56.0 classroom teachers (on an FTE basis), for a student–teacher ratio of 10.8:1. Seats on the high school district's nine-member board of education are allocated based on the population of the constituent municipalities, with one seat assigned to Ogdensburg.

Students in Ogdensburg and all of Sussex County are eligible to apply to attend Sussex County Technical School in Sparta Township, which is open to students from all of the county.

== Transportation ==
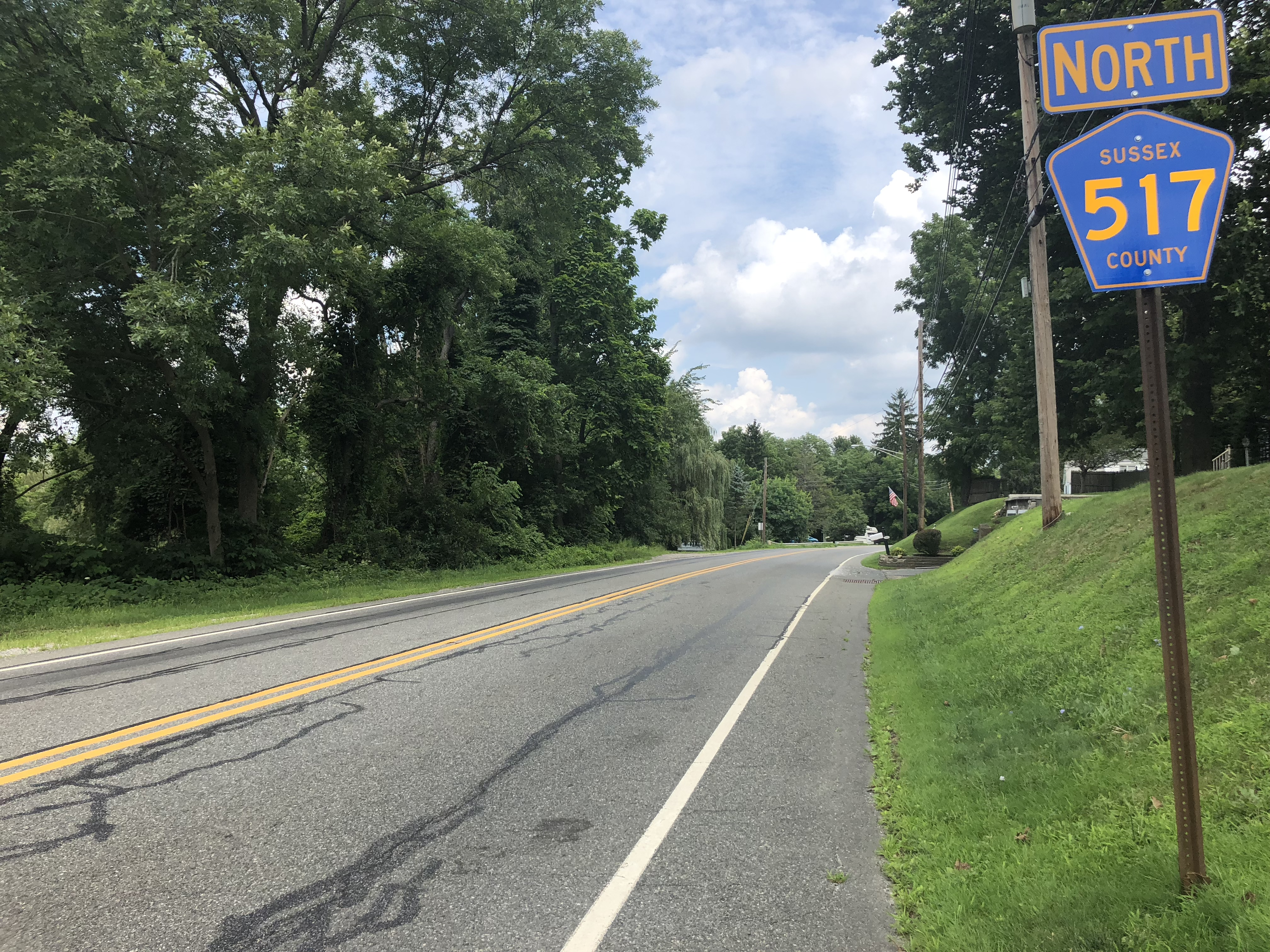
County Route 517 northbound in Ogdensburg

=== Roads and highways ===
As of May 2010, the borough had a total of 14.36 miles (23.11 km) of roadways, of which 12.63 miles (20.33 km) were maintained by the municipality and 1.73 miles (2.78 km) by Sussex County.

No Interstate, U.S. or state highways run through Ogdensburg. The most significant roadway serving the borough is County Route 517.

=== Public transportation ===
The county provides Skylands Ride bus service operating between Sussex and Newton.

== Historic sites ==
- Ogdensburg is home to the following locations on the National Register of Historic Places:
  - Backwards Tunnel – Cork Hill Road, 310 feet (94 m) north of Passaic Avenue intersection (added 2005)
  - Sterling Hill Mining Museum – 30 Plant Street (added 1991)
- The Old Schoolhouse and Firehouse Museum, operated by the Ogdensburg Historical Society, was designated an Ogdensburg Historic Site in 2006.
- In the late 19th Century, Thomas A. Edison built the Edison Ore-Milling Company near Ogdensburg, in Sparta, to enable production of iron from low grade ores using an electromagnetic process. The process proved unsuccessful on a production scale.
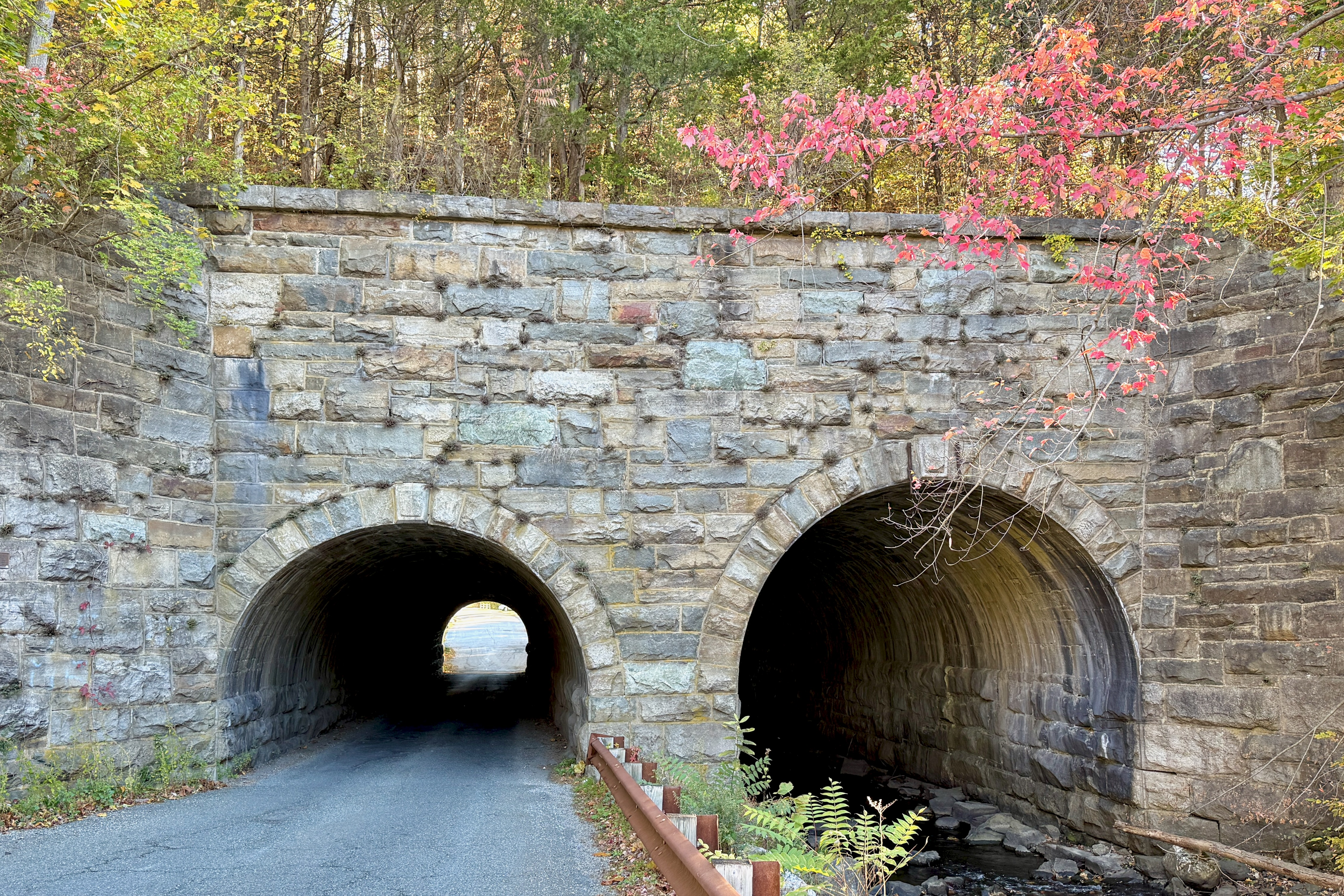
Backwards Tunnel

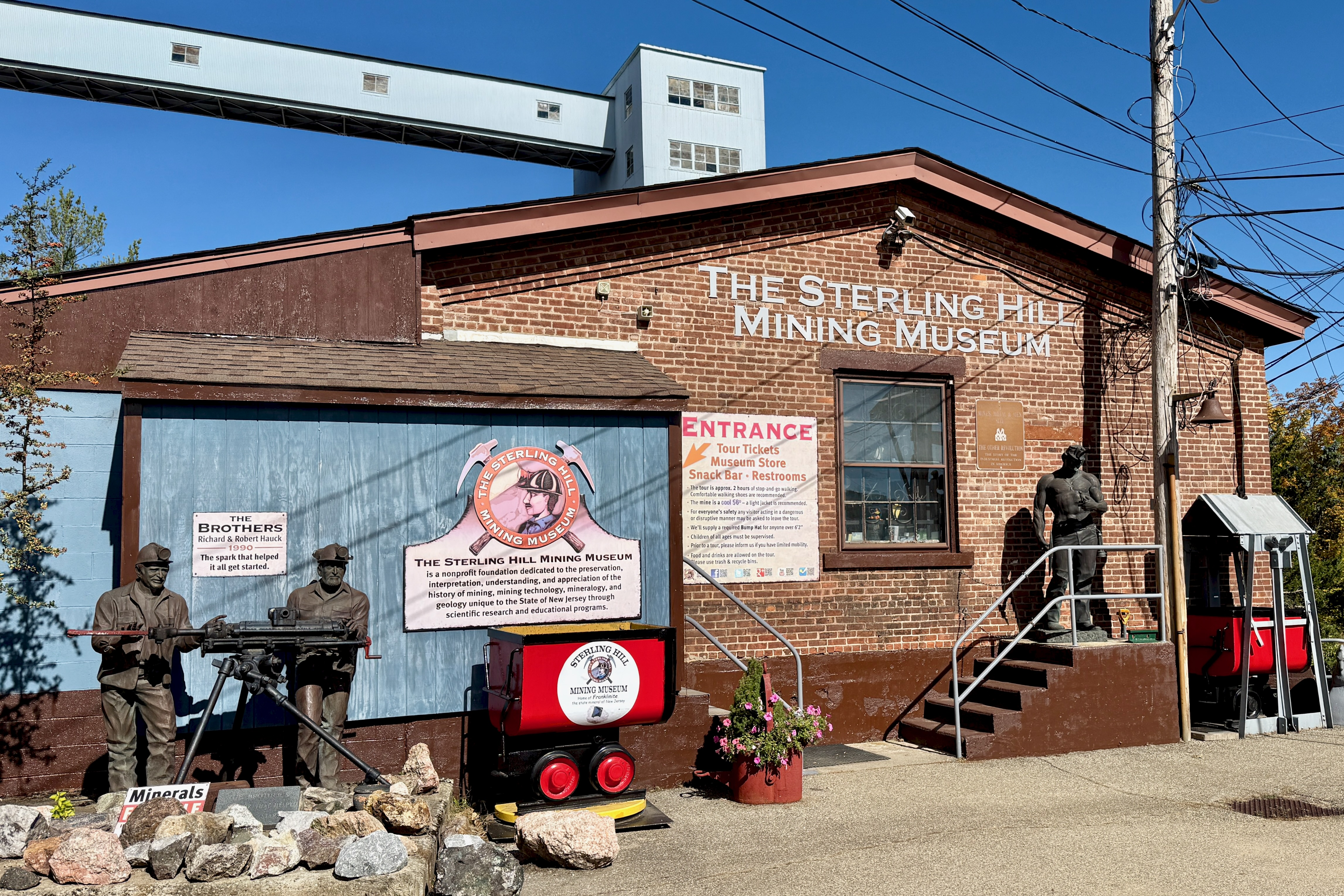
Sterling Hill Mining Museum

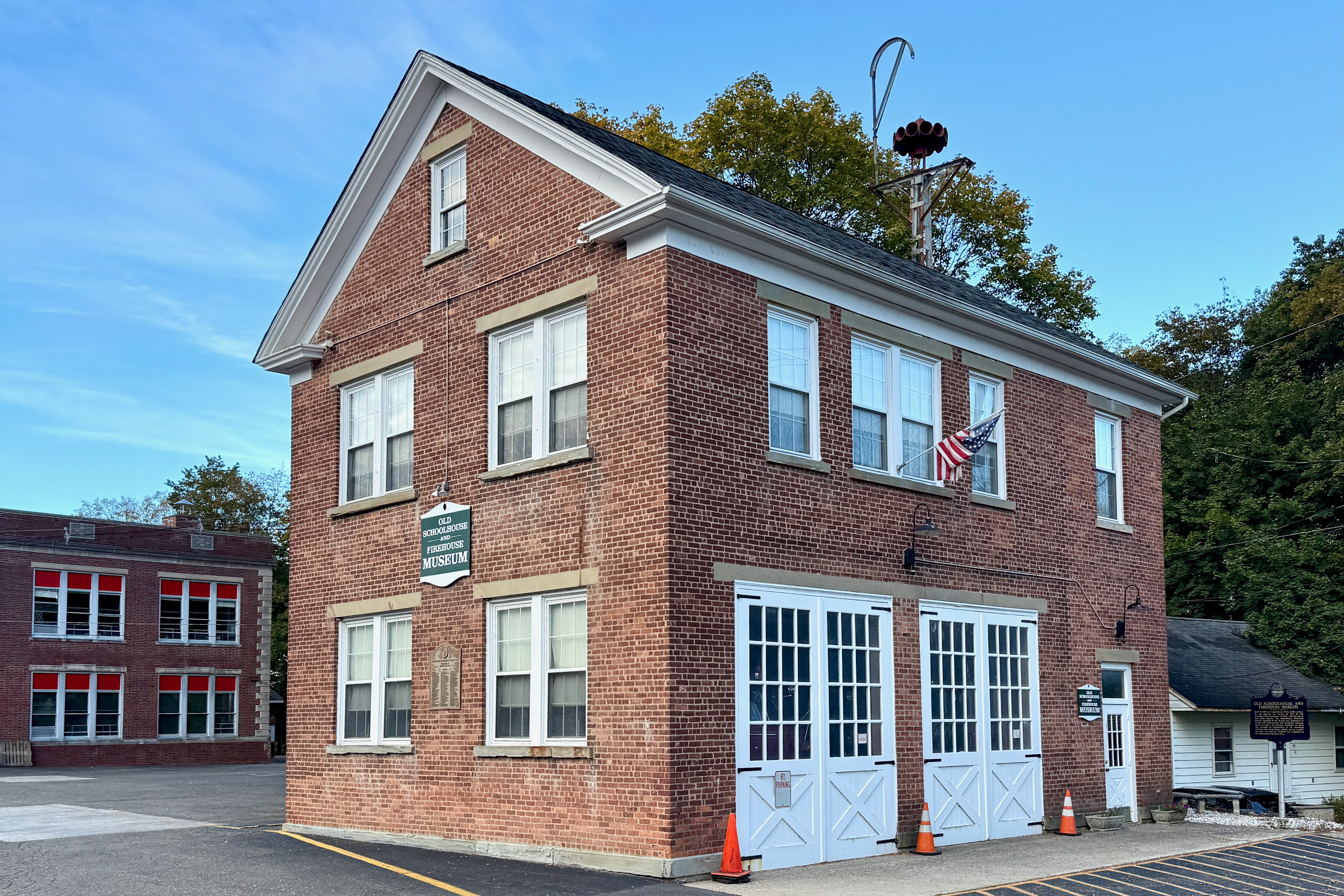
Old Schoolhouse and Firehouse Museum

== Notable people ==
People who were born in, residents of, or otherwise closely associated with Ogdensburg include:

- Jason Davis (born 1974), record executive
