= Tuthilltown Bridge =

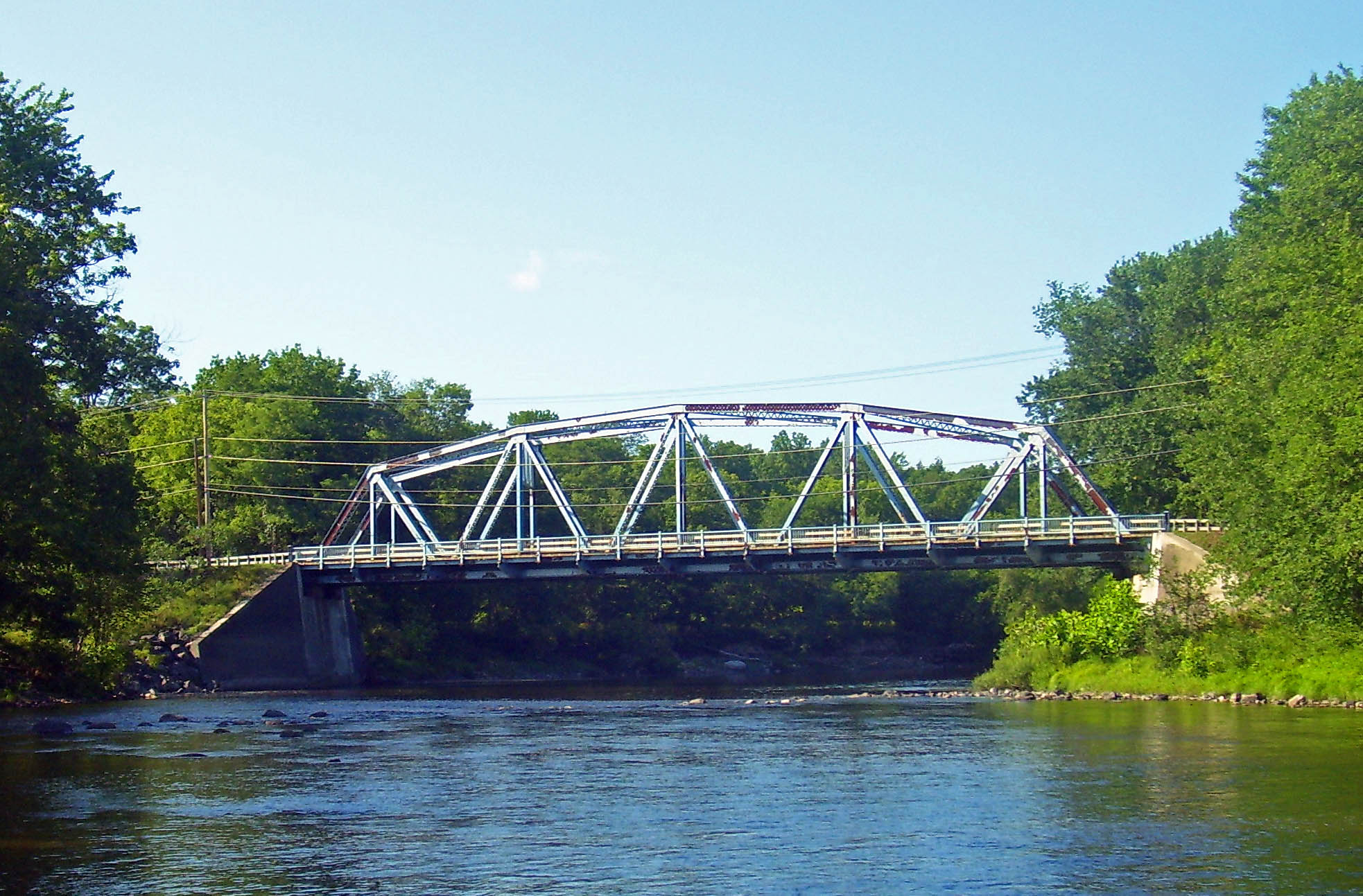
- Bridge seen from upriver, near old ford
- Coordinates: 41°41′16″N 74°09′56″W
- Carries: Two lanes of US 44 / NY 55
- Crosses: Wallkill River
- Locale: Town of Gardiner, NY, United States
- Maintained by: New York State Department of Transportation
- ID number: 000000001025490

Characteristics
- Design: Steel through truss
- Total length: 182 feet (60 m)
- Width: 24 feet (7 m)
- Load limit: 52 tons (47 tonnes)

History
- Construction end: 1938

Statistics
- Daily traffic: 4302

Tuthilltown Bridge is located in the Town of Gardiner in Ulster County, New York, United States, approximately 1 miles (1.6 km) west of the eponymous hamlet. It carries US 44/NY 55 across the north-flowing Wallkill River just downstream from where it is joined by the Shawangunk Kill, its largest tributary. It is a steel through truss bridge built in 1938 and reconstructed in 1993

The bridge was built to replace a ford, still visible upstream from the bridge. Tuthilltown, the settlement that once flourished in the area, had been the western terminus of the Farmer's Turnpike, built in 1850 to provide local farmers with access to shipping on the Hudson River 20 miles (32 km) to the east. The area is today known just as Tuthill, but the bridge, the Tuthilltown Gristmill and a nearby road retain the old name.
