= Bodine's Bridge =

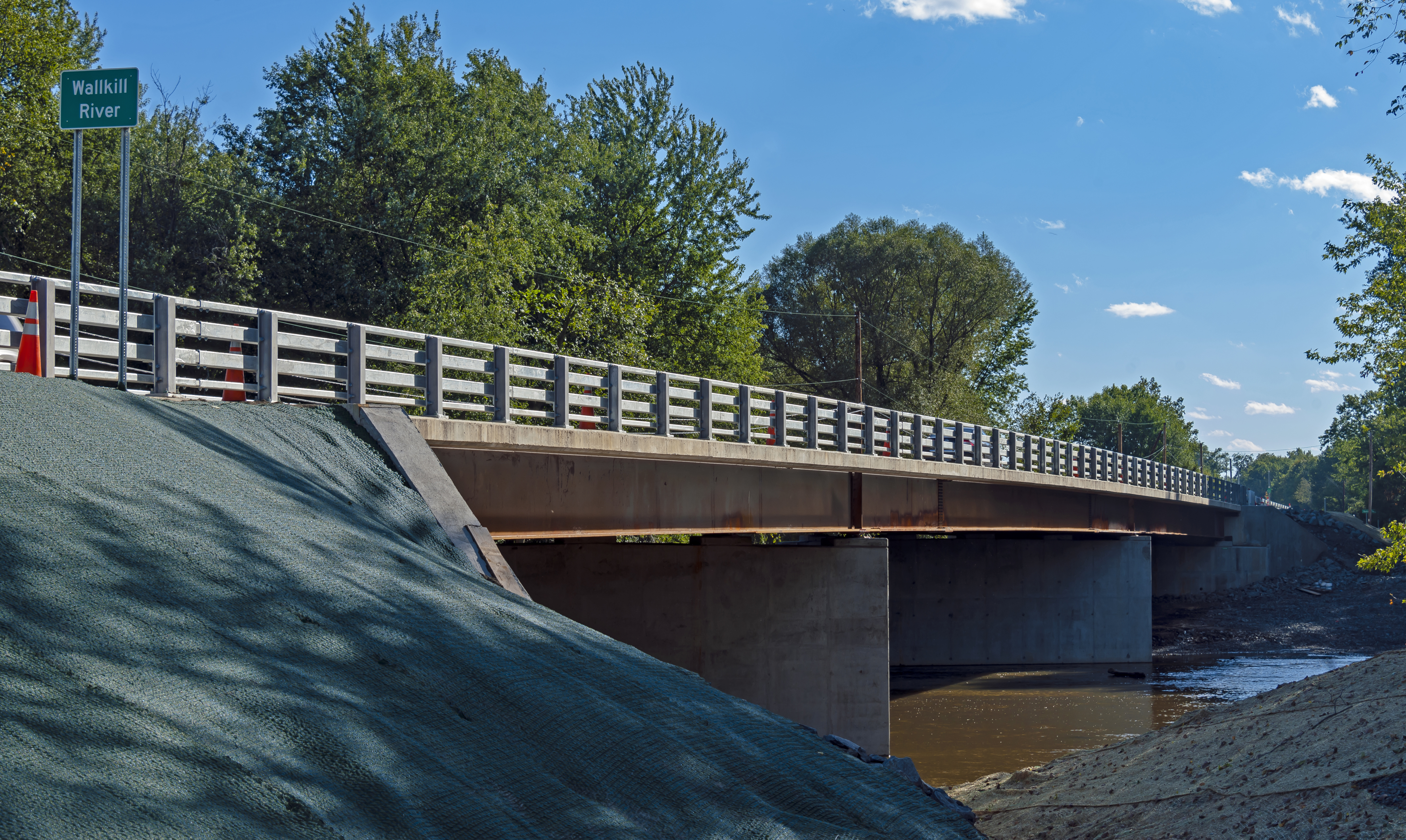
- Bridge seen from north, 2015
- Coordinates: 41°30′09″N 74°15′50″W
- Carries: Two lanes of NY 211
- Crosses: Wallkill River
- Locale: Town of Montgomery, NY
- Maintained by: New York State Department of Transportation
- ID number: 000000001040980

Characteristics
- Design: viaduct
- Total length: 340 feet (103 m)
- Width: 24 feet (7.3 m)
- No. of spans: 3
- Load limit: 30 tons (27.2 tonnes)

History
- Opened: 2015

Statistics
- Daily traffic: 6,035

Location
- Interactive map of Bodine's Bridge

Bodine's Bridge carries New York State Route 211 across the Wallkill River, a mile (1.6 km) south (west by the highway's signed direction) of the village of Montgomery, New York, United States, near Orange County Airport. At 340 feet (103 m) in length, the steel through truss is the longest bridge along Route 211.

The current bridge was built in 2015. Its predecessor dated to 1933, with a reconstruction in 1970. All the bridges at the location have been named after nearby, still-standing Bodine's Tavern, a popular rest stop on the early 19th century Minisink to Montgomery Turnpike, which later became Route 211. The house, now listed on the National Register of Historic Places, was built near a popular ford along the river, which the bridges were built over.

Due to the bridge's location in the river's flood plain, it is often closed after heavy rains when its approaches, particularly to the south, are overrun by rising waters. This happened most recently during the April 2007 Nor'easter.

In summer 2015 the state Department of Transportation began replacing the bridge. Route 211 was closed through the bridge at the beginning of June; traffic was detoured via Goshen Turnpike (County Route 101) in the Town of Wallkill through the hamlet of Scotchtown to State Route 17K via Scotchtown–Collabar Road (County Route 47). The new bridge, completed and opened in September of that year, has three continuous spans, two 12-foot (3.7 m) travel lanes and 6-foot (1.8 m) shoulders. The project was estimated to have cost $8.1 million; it is being paid for by a Federal Emergency Management Agency grant program to replace old scour-prone bridges in areas subject to frequent flooding.
