= Ammonium permanganate =

Names
- IUPAC name Ammonium manganate(VII)
- Other names Ammonium permanganate

Identifiers
CAS Number	13446-10-1
3D model (JSmol)	Interactive image; Interactive image
ChemSpider	55512
PubChem CID	61604
UN number	3085, 1482
CompTox Dashboard (EPA)	DTXSID101028187
- InChI: InChI=1S/Mn.H3N.4O/h;1H3;;;;/q;;;;;-1/p+1 Key: PASCZIGWJWZUOV-UHFFFAOYSA-O; InChI=1/Mn.H3N.4O/h;1H3;;;;/q;;;;;-1/p+1/rMnO4.H3N/c2-1(3,4)5;/h;1H3/q-1;/p+1 Key: PASCZIGWJWZUOV-AGRLYYGXAH
- SMILES: [O-][Mn](=O)(=O)=O.[N+]; [O-][Mn](=O)(=O)=O.[NH4+]

Properties
Chemical formula	NH_{4}MnO_{4}
Molar mass	136.973 g·mol^{−1}
Appearance	rhombic needle crystals or powder with rich violet-brown or dark purple metallic sheen, become steel-gray in storage; magenta–rose in solution
Density	2.2g/cm^{3}, solid
Melting point	decomposes
Solubility in water	8.0 g/100 ml at 15 °C

Structure
Crystal structure	Orthorhombic

Thermochemistry
Std molar entropy (S^{⦵}_{298})	J.K^{−1}.mol^{−1}

Hazards
- Occupational safety and health (OHS/OSH)
Main hazards	Oxidant (O), Harmful (Xn), Dangerous for the environment (N)
NFPA 704 (fire diamond)	0 0 3 OX
Safety data sheet (SDS)	[ External MSDS]

Related compounds
Other anions	Ammonium perrhenate
Other cations	Sodium permanganate; Potassium permanganate
Related compounds	Potassium manganate (K_{2}MnO_{4}); Manganese heptoxide
- Except where otherwise noted, data are given for materials in their standard state (at 25 °C [77 °F], 100 kPa). verify (what is ?) Infobox references

Ammonium permanganate is the chemical compound NH_{4}MnO_{4}, or NH_{3}·HMnO_{4}. It is a water soluble, violet-brown or dark purple salt.

== Preparation ==
Ammonium permanganate was first prepared by Eilhard Mitscherlich in 1824 by reaction of silver permanganate with equal molar amount of ammonium chloride, filtering the silver chloride and evaporating the water.

AgMnO_{4} + NH_{4}Cl → AgCl + NH_{4}MnO_{4}

It can also be prepared in a similar way from potassium permanganate and ammonium chloride.

KMnO_{4} +NH_{4}Cl → KCl + NH_{4}MnO_{4}

== Properties ==
Ammonium permanganate is a strong oxidizer, owing to its permanganate anion, and it is a moderately strong explosive, owing to the combination of the oxidizing permanganate anion and the reducing ammonium cation. Dry ammonium permanganate can be detonated by heat, shock, or friction, and it may explode at temperatures above 140 °F (60 °C).

Ammonium permanganate decomposes explosively to manganese dioxide, nitrogen, and water:

2 NH_{4}MnO_{4} → 2 MnO_{2} + N_{2} + 4 H_{2}O

Ammonium permanganate decomposes slowly in storage even at normal temperatures. A sample stored for 3 months was only 96% pure, after 6 months it assumed color of iodine and had strong smell of nitrogen oxides. It emits toxic fumes when decomposed by heat.

Quaternary ammonium permanganate compounds can be prepared, such as tetrabutylammonium permanganate and benzyltriethylammonium permanganate.
