= Sodium manganate =

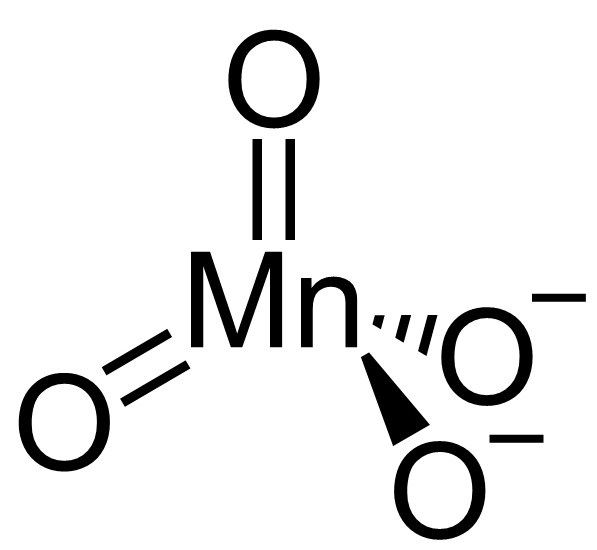

Identifiers
| CAS Number | 15702-33-7 |
| 3D model (JSmol) | Interactive image |
| PubChem CID | 22558567 |
| CompTox Dashboard (EPA) | DTXSID901319273 |
- InChI: InChI=1S/Mn.2Na.4O/q;2*+1;;;2*-1 Key: BNBLBRISEAQIHU-UHFFFAOYSA-N
- SMILES: [O-][Mn](=O)(=O)[O-].[Na+].[Na+]

Properties
| Chemical formula | MnNa_{2}O_{4} |
| Molar mass | 164.914 g·mol^{−1} |
| Appearance | deep green solid |

Related compounds
| Related compounds | Barium manganate |
- Except where otherwise noted, data are given for materials in their standard state (at 25 °C [77 °F], 100 kPa). verify (what is ?) Infobox references

Sodium manganate is the inorganic compound with the formula Na_{2}MnO_{4}. This deep green solid is a rarely encountered analogue of the related salt K_{2}MnO_{4}. Sodium manganate is rare because it cannot be readily prepared from the oxidation of manganese dioxide and sodium hydroxide. Instead this oxidation reaction tends to stop at producing sodium hypomanganate, Na_{3}MnO_{4}, and even this Mn(V) salt is unstable in solution. Sodium manganate can be produced by reduction of sodium permanganate under basic conditions:

4 NaOH + 4NaMnO_{4} → 4 Na_{2}MnO_{4} + 2 H_{2}O + O_{2}

Because NaMnO_{4} is difficult to prepare, sodium permanganate is more expensive than potassium permanganate.
