= Hypomanganate =

Trivalent anion

In chemistry, hypomanganate, also called manganate(V) or tetraoxidomanganate(3−), is a trivalent anion (negative ion) composed of manganese and oxygen, with formula MnO^{3−}_{4}.

Hypomanganates are usually bright blue. Potassium hypomanganate K_{3}MnO_{4} is the best known salt, but sodium hypomanganate Na_{3}MnO_{4}, barium hypomanganate Ba_{3}(MnO_{4})_{2}, and the mixed potassium-barium salt KBaMnO_{4} is also known. The anion can replace phosphate PO^{3−}_{4} in synthetic variants of the minerals apatite and brownmillerite.

== History ==
The manganate(V) anion was first reported in 1946 by Hermann Lux, who synthesized the intensely blue sodium hypomanganate by reacting sodium oxide Na_{2}O and manganese dioxide MnO_{2} in fused sodium nitrite NaNO_{2} at 500 °C. He also crystalized the salt from strong (50%) sodium hydroxide solutions as the decahydrate Na_{3}MnO_{4}·10H_{2}O.

== Structure and properties ==
Manganate(V) is a tetrahedral oxyanion structurally similar to sulfate, manganate, and permanganate. As expected for a tetrahedral complex with a d^{2} configuration, the anion has a triplet ground state.

The anion is a bright blue species with a visible absorption maximum at wavelength λ_{max} = 670 nm (ε = 900 dm^{3} mol^{−1} cm^{−1}).

== Stability ==
Hypomanganate is unstable towards disproportionation to manganate(VI) and manganese dioxide: The estimated electrode potentials at pH 14 are:

MnO^{2−}_{4} + e^{−} ⇌ MnO^{3−}_{4} E = +0.27 V
MnO^{3−}_{4} + e^{−} + 2 H_{2}O ⇌ MnO_{2} + 4 OH^{−} E = +0.96 V

However, the reaction is slow in very alkaline solutions (with OH^{−} concentration above 5–10 mol/L).

The disproportionation is believed to pass through a protonated intermediate, with the acid dissociation constant for the reaction HMnO^{2−}_{4} ⇌ MnO^{3−}_{4} + H^{+} being estimated as pK_{a} = 13.7 ± 0.2. However, K_{3}MnO_{4} has been cocrystallized with Ca_{2}Cl(PO_{4}), allowing the study of the UV–visible spectrum of the hypomanganate ion.

== Preparation ==
Hypomanganates may be prepared by the careful reduction of manganates with sulfite, hydrogen peroxide or mandelate.

Hypomanganates can also be prepared by the solid state method under O_{2} flow near 1000 °C. They can be prepared also via low temperature routes such as hydrothermal synthesis or flux growth. It is produced by dissolving manganese dioxide in molten sodium nitrite.

== Uses ==
The strontium vanadate fluoride Sr_{5}(VO_{4})_{3}F compound, with hypomanganate substituted for some vanadate units, has been investigated for potential use in near infrared lasers.

The barium salt Ba_{3}(MnO_{4})_{2} has interesting magnetic properties.

== Related compounds ==
In theory, hypomanganate would be the conjugate base of hypomanganic acid H_{3}MnO_{4}. This acid cannot be formed because of its rapid disproportionation, but its third acid dissociation constant has been estimated by pulse radiolysis techniques:

HMnO^{2−}_{4} ⇌ MnO^{3−}_{4} + H^{+} pK_{a} = 13.7 ± 0.2

Cyclic esters of hypomanganic acid are thought to be intermediates in the oxidation of alkenes by permanganate.

== See also ==
- Dimanganite, a manganate(III) anion Mn_{2}O^{6−}_{6}
- Manganate or manganate(VI), MnO^{2−}_{4}
- Permanganate or manganate(VII), MnO^{−}_{4}
