= Chemical chameleon =

Chemical redox reaction

Chemical chameleon reaction

The chemical chameleon is a redox reaction, well known from classroom demonstrations, that exploits the dramatic color changes associated with the various oxidation states of manganese.

Glauber reported the first description of the production of potassium permanganate when he noted that manganese dioxide (as the mineral pyrolusite) could be reacted at high temperatures with alkali to obtain a material that dissolved in water to give a green solution which slowly shifted to a violet-red. This process, similar to that still used in the production of potassium permanganate, oxidized manganese dioxide to potassium manganate which, acidified by carbon dioxide absorbed from the air, oxidized further to purple potassium permanganate.

The chemical chameleon reaction shows the process in reverse, by reducing violet potassium permanganate first to green potassium manganate and eventually to brown manganese dioxide:

KMnO_{4} (violet) → K_{2}MnO_{4} (green) → MnO_{2} (brown/yellow suspension)

Blue potassium hypomanganate may also form as an intermediate.

Oxidation states of manganese
+7	KMnO_{4} (violet)
+6	K_{2}MnO_{4} (green)
+5	K_{3}MnO_{4} (blue)
+4	MnO_{2} (yellow)

The reaction proceeds in alkaline conditions under the influence of a reducing agent. Sodium hydroxide, potassium hydroxide, and ammonium hydroxide can be used to alkalize the permanganate solution, while a variety of reducing agents can be used, sugars being common.

A similar demonstration involves soaking paper in alkalized permanganate solution, which produces the same color changes as the paper is oxidized and the permanganate reduced.
