= Sodium bismuthate =

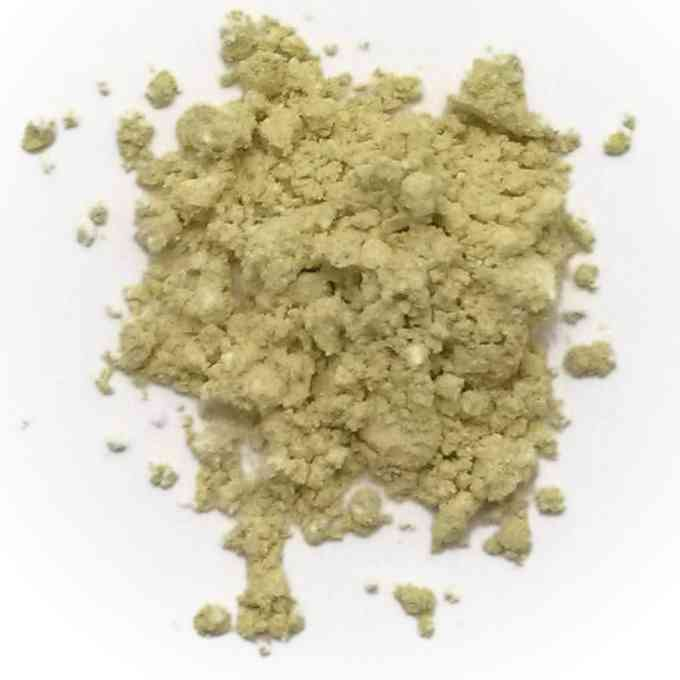
- NaBiO_{3} powder

Names
- Other names Sodium bismuth oxide

Identifiers
CAS Number	12232-99-4
3D model (JSmol)	Interactive image
ChemSpider	74877
ECHA InfoCard	100.032.220
EC Number	235-455-6
PubChem CID	4063671
UNII	2PR2L7N425
CompTox Dashboard (EPA)	DTXSID9065285
- InChI: InChI=1S/Bi.Na.3O/q;+1;;;-1
- SMILES: [O-][Bi](=O)=O.[Na+]

Properties
Chemical formula	NaBiO_{3}
Molar mass	279.967 g·mol^{−1}
Appearance	Yellow to yellowish-brown odorless powder
Density	6.50 g/cm^{3}
Solubility in water	Insoluble in cold, decomposes in hot water

Hazards
- GHS labelling
Pictograms	(GHS07: Exclamation mark)
Signal word	Warning
Hazard statements	H302, H315, H319, H335
Precautionary statements	P261, P264, P270, P271, P280, P301+P312, P302+P352, P304+P340, P305+P351+P338, P312, P321, P330, P332+P313, P337+P313, P362, P403+P233, P405, P501
- Lethal dose or concentration (LD, LC)
LD_{50} (median dose)	420 mg/kg (rat, oral)

Related compounds
Other anions	Sodium antimonate
Other cations	Potassium bismuthate
Related compounds	Sodium hexafluorobismuthate(V)
- Except where otherwise noted, data are given for materials in their standard state (at 25 °C [77 °F], 100 kPa). verify (what is ?) Infobox references

Sodium bismuthate is an inorganic compound, and a strong oxidiser with chemical formula NaBiO_{3}. It is somewhat hygroscopic, but not soluble in cold water, which can be convenient since the reagent can be easily removed after the reaction. It is one of the few water insoluble sodium salts. Commercial samples may be a mixture of bismuth(V) oxide, sodium carbonate and sodium peroxide.

A related compound with the approximate formula Na_{3}BiO_{4} also exists.

== Structure ==
Sodium bismuthate adopts an ilmenite structure, consisting of octahedral bismuth(V) centers and sodium cations. The average Bi–O distance is 2.116 Å. The ilmenite structure is related to the corundum structure (Al_{2}O_{3}) with a layer structure formed by close packed oxygen atoms with the two different cations alternating in octahedral sites.

== Synthesis ==
Bismuth oxidizes to the +5 oxidation state only with difficulty in the absence of alkali. Synthesis is performed by making a suspension of bismuth trioxide in a boiling sodium hydroxide solution. It is then oxidized by addition of bromine to form sodium bismuthate.

Bi_{2}O_{3} + 6 NaOH + 2 Br_{2} → 2 NaBiO_{3} + 4 NaBr + 3 H_{2}O

Another synthesis of NaBiO_{3} involves oxidizing a mixture of sodium oxide and bismuth(III) oxide with air (as the source of O_{2}):

Na_{2}O + Bi_{2}O_{3} + O_{2} → 2 NaBiO_{3}

The procedure is analogous to the oxidation of manganese dioxide in alkali to give sodium manganate.

Vial of NaBiO_{3}

== Reactions ==
Storage conditions with moisture and high temperatures are detrimental to sodium bismuthate, as it oxidizes water, decomposing into sodium hydroxide and bismuth(III) oxide:

2 NaBiO_{3} + H_{2}O → 2 NaOH + Bi_{2}O_{3} + O_{2}

It is decomposed faster by acids. In HCl, NaBiO_{3} also reacts to form chlorine gas.

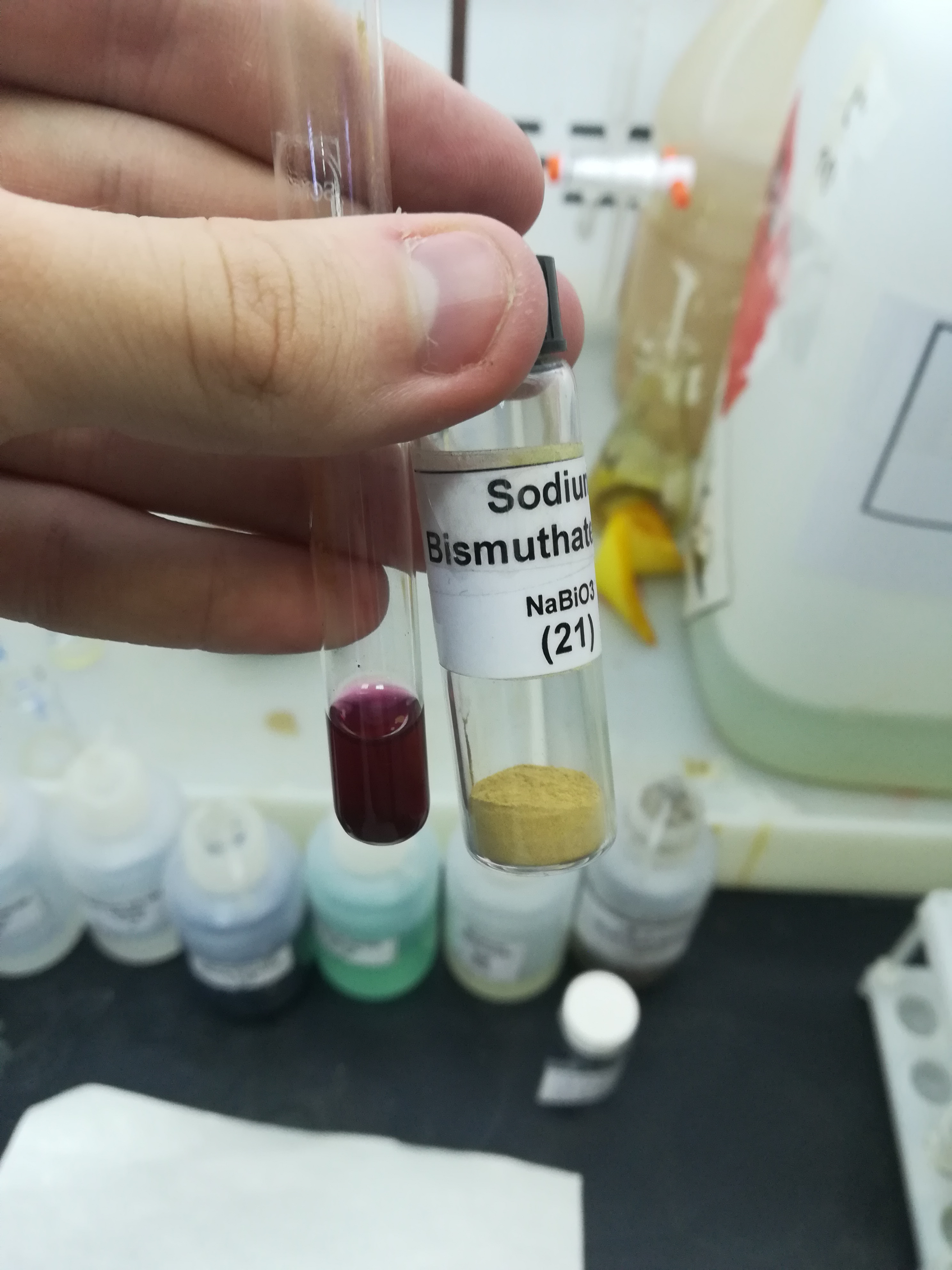
Positive test for manganese with NaBiO_{3}

NaBiO_{3} may be used to detect manganese qualitatively and quantitatively. As a strong oxidizer, it converts almost any manganese compound to permanganate, which is easily assayed spectrophotometrically. To do this, some NaBiO_{3} and the sample are reacted in a hot solution of sulfuric acid or nitric acid. Permanganate has a violet color and maximum absorbance at 510 nm. The reaction is:

2 Mn^{2+} + 5 NaBiO_{3} + 14 H^{+} → 2 MnO_{4}^{−} + 5 Bi^{3+} + 5 Na^{+} + 7 H_{2}O

Sodium bismuthate can perform oxidative 1,2-cleavage on glycols, ketols and alpha hydroxy acids with no further oxidation of the (possible) aldehyde products:

R_{2}C(OH)−C(OH)−R_{2} → R_{2}C=O + O=CR_{2}
R_{2}C(OH)−C(O)−R → R_{2}C=O + RCOOH
R_{2}C(OH)−COOH → R_{2}C=O + CO_{2}

These cleavages can be done in the presence of acetic or phosphoric acid at room temperature. Alcohols like methanol or ethanol can be used as the reaction media, as they are oxidized slowly with sodium bismuthate. Lead tetraacetate performs similar reactions, but anhydrous conditions, as required in the use of lead tetraacetate, are not necessary for sodium bismuthate.

NaBiO_{3} can be used for lab-scale plutonium separation (see bismuth phosphate process).

== Safety ==
NaBiO_{3} is a mild mechanical irritant. Upon ingestion it is moderately toxic with symptoms akin to lead poisoning: abdominal pain and vomiting. Large doses cause diarrhea and death. Continued absorption of NaBiO_{3} into body causes permanent kidney damage. These effects are due to the toxicity of bismuth. Oral absolute lethal dose (LD_{100}) of NaBiO_{3} is 720 mg/kg for rats, and 510 mg/kg for rabbits.
