= Barium manganate =

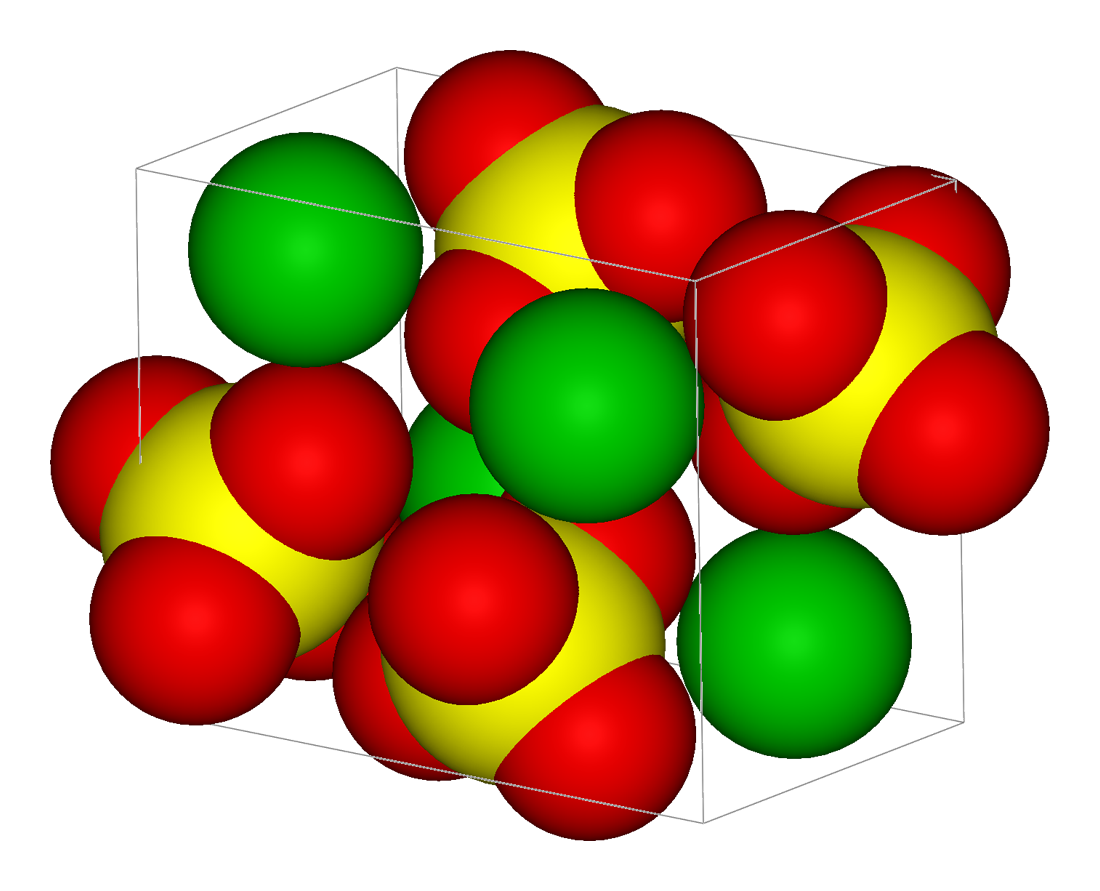

Identifiers
CAS Number	7787-35-1
3D model (JSmol)	Interactive image
ECHA InfoCard	100.029.190
EC Number	232-109-6
PubChem CID	3084030
UNII	R6Q81342Z4
CompTox Dashboard (EPA)	DTXSID801046691
- InChI: InChI=1S/Ba.Mn.4O/q+2;;;;2*-1 Key: ZZCNKSMCIZCVDR-UHFFFAOYSA-N
- SMILES: [O-][Mn](=O)(=O)[O-].[Ba+2]

Properties
Chemical formula	BaMnO_{4}
Molar mass	256.26 g/mol
Appearance	light blue to dark blue and black powder
Density	4.85 g/cm^{3}
Solubility in water	insoluble

Hazards
- Occupational safety and health (OHS/OSH)
Main hazards	GHS03, GHS07: oxidizing, skin and eye irritant
- Except where otherwise noted, data are given for materials in their standard state (at 25 °C [77 °F], 100 kPa). Infobox references

Barium manganate is an inorganic compound with the formula BaMnO_{4}. It is used as an oxidant in organic chemistry. It belongs to a class of compounds known as manganates in which the manganese resides in a +6 oxidation state. Manganate should not be confused with permanganate which contains manganese(VII). Barium manganate is a powerful oxidant, popular in organic synthesis and can be used in a wide variety of oxidation reactions.

== Properties ==
The manganate(VI) ion is a d^{1} ion and is tetrahedral with bond angles of approximately 109.5°. The Mn−O bond lengths in BaMnO_{4} and K_{2}MnO_{4} are identical at 1.66 Å. In comparison, the Mn-O bond length in MnO^{2−}_{4} is longer than in MnO_{4}^{−} of 1.56 Å and shorter than the Mn−O bond found in MnO_{2}, 1.89 Å. Barium manganate is isomorphous with BaCrO_{4} and BaSO_{4}. Barium manganate can appear as a dark blue or green to black crystals. Barium manganate is indefinitely stable, active and can be stored for months in dry conditions.

== Preparation ==
Barium manganate can be prepared from potassium manganate and barium chloride by salt metathesis to give insoluble barium manganate:

BaCl_{2} + K_{2}MnO_{4} → 2 KCl + BaMnO_{4}↓

== Applications ==
Barium manganate oxidizes a number of functional groups efficiently and selectively: alcohols to carbonyls, diols to lactones, thiols to disulfides, aromatic amines to azo-compounds, hydroquinone to p-benzoquinone, benzylamine to benzaldehyde, hydrazones to diazo compounds, etc. It does not oxidize saturated hydrocarbons, alkenes, unsaturated ketones, and tertiary amines. Barium manganate is a common substitute for MnO_{2}. It is easier to prepare, reacts more efficiently, and the substrate:oxidant ratios are closer to theory.

Another use for barium manganate was as a component of the inorganic pigment manganese blue, which is no longer produced on an industrial scale.
