= Henry Bollmann Condy =

British chemist and businessman

Henry Bollmann Condy (8 July 1826 – 24 September 1907) was an English chemist and industrialist best noted for giving his name to the popular 19th and 20th century disinfectants Condy's Crystals and Condy's Fluid.

Condy was born in London. His mother inherited a chemical factory in Battersea from a Hungarian chemist named Dr Bollmann. A company was eventually set up in London that was known variously as Bollmann Condy and Co., Condy and Co., Condy Brothers and Co., Condy's Fluid Co., and Condy and Mitchell Ltd. The company began as a firm of vinegar manufacturers and drysalters. It later moved into essential oil, vitriol and disinfectant production. Condy became a partner in the company in 1854.

Condy had an interest in disinfectants and marketed products such as "ozonised water". He developed and patented "Condy's fluid" in 1857. Condy’s fluid was a disinfectant solution of alkaline manganates and permanganates that could be taken internally or used externally. It had various indications including the treatment and prevention of scarlet fever. A more stable crystalline version of Condy's fluid was subsequently developed and marketed as Condy's Crystals or Condy's Powder. The fluid and crystals were both manufactured at the company’s works in Battersea between 1867 and 1897. The factory was taken over by Morgan Crucible.

He died in Folkestone, Kent.

== Footnote ==
Advertisements that appeared in the Kingston newspaper The Gleaner during the 1860s and 1870s claimed that Condy's fluid was used

- To prevent the communication of Infectious Diseases
- To purify Sick Rooms and the Wards of Hospitals and Crowded Places.
- To disinfect water
- To purify Stagnant Water
- To purify Cattle Dog and where offensive matter lies about.
- To ensure Purity of Water employed for drinking -which frequently contains much organic matter
- To purify fever wards or -in cases of death- from a contagious disease or to prevent offensive effluvia arising from a dead body
- To purify sick persons
- To deprive Night-chairs of offensive odour
- To purify the atmosphere of Rooms in which there are Dead for the Visits of Undertakers and Jurymen
- To sweeten Musty odours
- To destroy Canker and Fungus on Trees
- To purify Bilge Water in a Ship's Well To parity with the Interior or Hold of a Ship
- To extirpate from Fowl-Houses and to preserve the health of Fowl
- To disinfect the Sail while emptying Cess-pools
