= Potassium hypomanganate =

Names
- IUPAC names potassium manganate(V) potassium tetraoxidomanganate(3−)

Identifiers
3D model (JSmol)	Interactive image
ChemSpider	64887110
PubChem CID	118856760
CompTox Dashboard (EPA)	DTXSID20893219
- InChI: InChI=1S/3K.Mn.4O/q3*+1;-3;;;; Key: BABZALCEXXHDEO-UHFFFAOYSA-N
- SMILES: O=[Mn-3](=O)(=O)=O.[K+].[K+].[K+]

Properties
Chemical formula	K_{3}MnO_{4}
Molar mass	236.229 g·mol^{−1}
Appearance	bright blue solid
Density	2.78 g/cm^{3}
Melting point	900 °C (1,650 °F; 1,170 K) (decomposes)
UV-vis (λ_{max})	670 nm (ε = 900 dm^{3} mol^{−1} cm^{−1})

Related compounds
Other anions	Potassium manganate Potassium permanganate
- Except where otherwise noted, data are given for materials in their standard state (at 25 °C [77 °F], 100 kPa). verify (what is ?) Infobox references

Potassium hypomanganate is the inorganic compound with the formula K_{3}MnO_{4}. Also known as potassium manganate(V), this bright blue solid is a rare example of a salt with the hypomanganate or manganate(V) anion, where the manganese atom is in the +5 oxidation state. It is an intermediate in the production of potassium permanganate and the industrially most important Mn(V) compound.

== Properties ==
Potassium hypomanganate is oxidized in water to potassium manganate:

2 K_{3}MnO_{4} + H_{2}O + 0.5 O_{2} → 2 KOH + 2 K_{2}MnO_{4}

However, it undergoes disproportionation in acidic solutions producing manganese dioxide and potassium permanganate.

In the absence of moisture, it is stable up to 900 °C. Above that temperature, it decomposes to potassium oxide, manganese(II,III) oxide, and oxygen.

== Preparative routes ==
The solid salt can be produced by the reaction of potassium carbonate and manganese carbonate in the presence of oxygen at 800 °C. However, in the industrial process of producing potassium permanganate, it is produced by fusing manganese dioxide and potassium hydroxide. The resulting hypomanganate further reacts with water to produce manganate.

A solution of potassium hypomanganate is produced:

- by two-electron reduction of potassium permanganate with excess potassium sulfite;

MnO^{−}_{4} + SO^{2−}_{3} + H_{2}O → MnO^{3−}_{4} + SO^{2−}_{4} + 2 H^{+}

- by the single-electron reduction of potassium manganate with hydrogen peroxide in 10 M potassium hydroxide solution;

2 MnO^{2−}_{4} + H_{2}O_{2} + 2 OH^{−} → 2 MnO^{3−}_{4} + O_{2} + 2 H_{2}O

- by the single-electron reduction of potassium manganate with mandelate in 3–10 M potassium hydroxide solution;

2 MnO^{2−}_{4} + C_{8}H_{7}O^{−}_{3} + 2 OH^{−} → 2 MnO^{3−}_{4} + C_{8}H_{5}O^{−}_{3} + 2 H_{2}O

- by disproportionation when manganese dioxide is dissolved in a concentrated solution of potassium hydroxide;

2 MnO_{2} + 3 OH^{−} → MnO^{3−}_{4} + MnOOH + H_{2}O

The compound is unstable due to the tendency of the hypomanganate anion to disproportionate in all but the most alkaline solutions.
