= Permanganometry =

Permanganometry is one of the techniques used in chemical quantitative analysis. It is a redox titration that involves the use of permanganates to measure the amount of analyte present in unknown chemical samples. It involves two steps, namely the titration of the analyte with potassium permanganate solution and then the standardization of potassium permanganate solution with standard sodium oxalate solution. The titration involves volumetric manipulations to prepare the analyte solutions.

Permanganometry allows the detection and estimation of the quantitative presence of various chemical species, such as iron(II), manganese(II), oxalate, nitrite, and hydrogen peroxide.

== Reaction ==
Depending on the conditions in which the titration is performed, the manganese is reduced from an oxidation of +7 to +2, +4, or +6.

In most cases, permanganometry is performed in a very acidic solution in which the following electrochemical reaction occurs:

MnO_{4}^{−} + 8 H^{+} + 5 e^{−} → Mn^{2+} + 4 H_{2}O; E^{⦵}_{red} = +1.51 V

which shows that KMnO_{4} (in an acidic medium) is a very strong oxidizing agent, able to oxidize Fe^{2+} (E^{⦵}_{Fe^{3+}/Fe^{2+}} = +0.77 V), Sn^{2+} (E^{⦵}_{Sn^{4+}/Sn^{2+}} = +0.2 V), and even Cl^{−} (E^{⦵}_{Cl_{2}/Cl^{−}} = +1.36 V).

In weak acidic medium MnO_{4}^{−} can not accept 5 electrons to form Mn^{2+}. Instead, it accepts only 3 electrons and forms solid MnO_{2} by the following reaction:

MnO_{4}^{−} + 4 H^{+} + 3 e^{−} → MnO_{2} + 2 H_{2}O; E^{⦵}_{red} = +1.69 V

In a strongly basic solution, with the concentration c(NaOH) > 1 mol dm^{−3}, only one electron is accepted to produce manganate:

MnO_{4}^{−} + e^{−} → MnO_{4}^{2−}; E^{⦵}_{red} = +0.56 V
