= Polypropylene drum =

The introduction of Polypropylene drums permitted the routine commercial use of a range of highly corrosive chemicals in the tanning industry, for processes such as depilation and bleaching. In spite of the cheapness of the processes, the required chemicals are too aggressive for most practical choices of metal drums.

== Polypropylene drums for aggressive chemical processes ==
Polypropylene is a semi-crystalline thermoplastic with high bonding strength, tough, stable, elastic, hard and highly abrasion- and impact-resistant. Because of its chemical and physical molecular structure, solid masses of polypropylene are highly resistant to a wide range of aggressive chemicals including aqueous solutions of salts, acids and alkalis. Applying these characteristics to the demands of the tannery, professor Mario Serrini invented the first polypropylene drum in the 1990s and subsequently he exploited the attributes of the material to refine the technical advantages and performance of the tanning process.

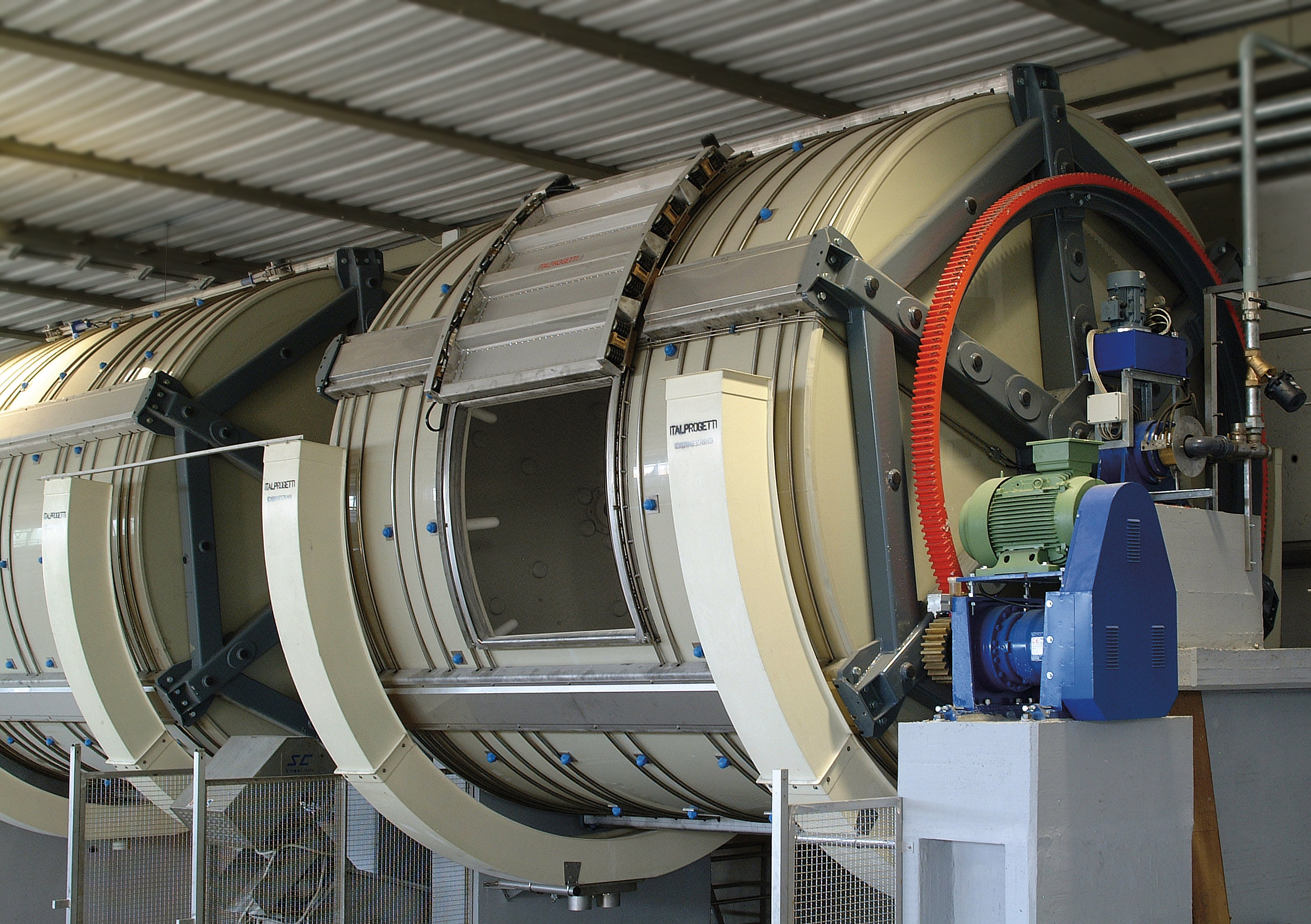
a PPH Drum in a tannery

== Relevant polypropylene attributes ==
The typical features of Polypropylene-Homopolymers (PPH) sheets used for construction of drums include:

- abrasion resistance
- electrical and thermal insulation
- extremely smooth surface
- high impact strength
- high level of hardness, stiffness and tensile strength
- practically no water absorption
- resistance to stress-cracking
- toughness both at temperatures between -5 °C and 95 °C
- very good chemical resistance

== Applicability of polypropylene drums to tanning processes ==
Polypropylene drums have proven suitable for innovative processes and adaptable to traditional ones. In particular:

- 'Oxidative liming': replacing the traditional process based on lime and sodium sulphide by oxidative processing with peroxide and soda.

Despite the advantages of oxidative liming (cleaner, finer grained product, reduced environmental pollution, lower costs, improved safety), oxidative liming was not hitherto practical on an industrial scale because of the effects of the chemicals on the traditional drums of wood or stainless steel.

- 'Zirconium tanning': Tanning by zirconium salts offers great advantages in obtaining a final product of great color brilliance and very light colours. However it is another aggressive process; it requires a very acid medium (about pH 1.0). Such strong acid causes rapid corrosion of metallic parts of the traditional drums. The polypropylene-lined drum prevents any contact between the acid and metal equipment.
- 'Sodium hypochlorite and potassium permanganate': These often are used in the processing of reptile skins, bleaching the material and preparing it for further processing. They are strong oxidising agents that rapidly damage metallic equipment, but a thick lining of polypropylene protects the metallic parts of the drum.
