= Bismuth phosphate process =

Plutonium extraction process

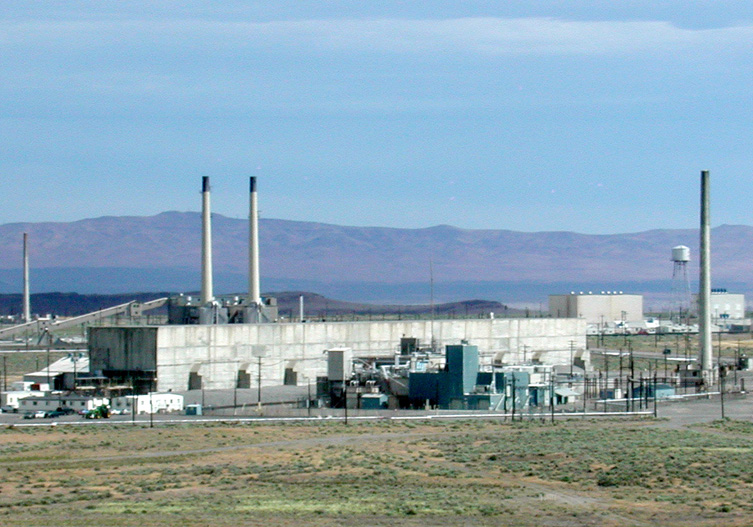
Hanford's U Plant was the third plutonium processing canyon built at the Hanford Site. Because the B and T Plants could process sufficient plutonium, it became a training facility.

The bismuth-phosphate process was used to extract plutonium from irradiated uranium taken from nuclear reactors. It was developed during World War II by Stanley G. Thompson, a chemist working for the Manhattan Project at the University of California, Berkeley. This process was used to produce plutonium at the Hanford Site. Plutonium was used in the atomic bomb that was used in the atomic bombing of Nagasaki in August 1945. The process was superseded in the 1950s by the REDOX and PUREX processes.

== Background ==
During World War II, plutonium was used to make both the first atomic bomb ever to be detonated (near Alamogordo, New Mexico) and the atomic bomb that was dropped on Nagasaki in Japan. Plutonium had only been isolated and chemically identified in 1941, so little was known about it, but it was thought that plutonium-239, like uranium-235, would be suitable for use in an atomic bomb.

== Producing plutonium on an industrial scale ==
Plutonium could be produced by irradiating uranium-238 in a nuclear reactor, but developing and building a reactor was a task for the Manhattan Project physicists. The task for the chemists was to develop a process to separate plutonium from the other fission products produced in the reactor, to do so on an industrial scale at a time when plutonium could be produced only in microscopic quantities, and to do so while working with dangerously radioactive chemicals like uranium—the chemistry of which little was known—and plutonium, the chemistry of which almost nothing was known.

== Experiments with separation methods ==
Chemists explored a variety of methods for separating plutonium from the other products that came out of the reactor:

- Glenn Seaborg, one of the chemists who had first isolated and chemically identified plutonium, used lanthanum fluoride to perform the first successful separation of a weighable quantity of plutonium in August 1942. This lanthanum fluoride process became the preferred method for use in the Manhattan Project's plutonium separation semiworks at the Clinton Engineer Works and the production facilities at the Hanford Site, but the bismuth phosphate process was eventually adopted instead because further work revealed a variety of difficulties with the lanthanum fluoride process:
  - Recovering the precipitate through filtration or centrifugation was difficult.
  - The lanthanum fluoride process required large quantiles of hydrogen fluoride, which corroded equipment.
  - There were problems stabilizing plutonium in its hexavalent state in the fluoride solution (discovered by Charles M. Cooper of DuPont, who would be responsible for the design and construction of the facilities).
- Isadore Perlman and William J. Knox Jr. looked into peroxide separation because most elements form soluble peroxides in neutral or acid solution. They soon discovered that plutonium was an exception. After a good deal of experimentation, they found that they could precipitate plutonium by adding hydrogen peroxide to a dilute uranyl nitrate solution. They were then able to get the process to work, but it produced tons of precipitate, in contrast to the lanthanum fluoride process that produced only kilograms.
- John E. Willard tried an alternative approach, based on the fact that some silicates absorbed plutonium more readily than other elements. This method worked but with low efficiency.
- Theodore T. Magel and Daniel K. Koshland Jr. researched a solvent-extraction processes.
- Harrison Brown and Orville F. Hill experimented with separation using volatility reactions, based on how uranium could be readily volatilized by fluorine.

== Discovery and adoption of the bismuth phosphate process ==
While the chemical engineers worked on these problems, Seaborg asked Stanley G. Thompson, a colleague at Berkeley, to have a look at the possibility of a phosphate process because it was known that the phosphates of many heavy metals were insoluble in an acid solutions.

Thompson tried phosphates of thorium, uranium, cerium, niobium and zirconium without success. He did not expect bismuth phosphate (BiPO_{4}) to work any better, but when he tried it on 18 December 1942, he was surprised to find that it carried 98 percent of the plutonium in solution. The crystalline structure of bismuth phosphate is similar to that of plutonium phosphate, and this became known as the bismuth phosphate process.

Cooper and Burris B. Cunningham were able to replicate Thompson's results, and the bismuth phosphate process was initially adopted as a fallback in case the lanthanum fluoride process could not be made to work. The processes were similar and the equipment used for lanthanum fluoride could be adapted for use with Thompson's bismuth phosphate process. In May 1943, the DuPont engineers decided to adopt the bismuth phosphate process for use in the Clinton semiworks and the Hanford production site.

== Discovery of plutonium's two oxidation states ==
As Brown, Hill, and other chemists explored plutonium chemistry, they made the crucial discovery that plutonium has two oxidation states, a tetravalent (+4) state and a hexavalent (+6) state, which have different chemical properties that could be exploited. (This work was performed at the Manhattan Project's Radiation Laboratory at the University of California, Metallurgical Laboratory at the University of Chicago and Ames Laboratory at Iowa State College.)

== Process ==
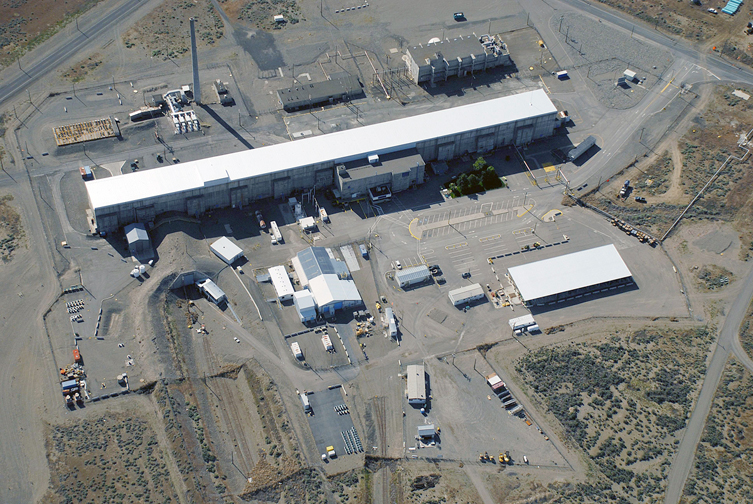
The T Plant was the first plutonium separation plant. It was nicknamed the "Queen Mary" for its resemblance to the ocean liner.

The bismuth phosphate process involved taking the irradiated uranium fuel slugs and removing their aluminium cladding. Because there were highly radioactive fission products inside, this had to be done remotely behind a thick concrete barrier. This was done in the "Canyons" (B and T buildings) at Hanford. The slugs were dumped into a dissolver, covered with sodium nitrate solution and brought to a boil, followed by slow addition of sodium hydroxide. After removing the waste and washing the slugs, three portions of nitric acid were used to dissolve the slugs.

The second step was to separate the plutonium from the uranium and the fission products. Bismuth nitrate and phosphoric acid were added, producing bismuth phosphate, which was precipitated carrying the plutonium with it. This was very similar to the lanthanum fluoride process, in which lanthanum fluoride was used as the carrier. The precipitate was removed from the solution with a centrifuge and the liquid discharged as waste. Getting rid of the fission products reduced the gamma radiation by 90 percent. The precipitate was a plutonium-containing cake which was placed in another tank and dissolved in nitric acid. Sodium bismuthate or potassium permanganate was added to oxidize the plutonium. Plutonium would be carried by the bismuth phosphate in the tetravalent state but not in the hexavalent state. The bismuth phosphate would then be precipitated as a by product, leaving the plutonium behind in solution.

This step was then repeated in the third step. The plutonium was reduced again by adding ferrous ammonium sulfate. Bismuth nitrate and phosphoric acid were added and bismuth phosphate precipitated. It was dissolved in nitric acid and the bismuth phosphate was precipitated. This step resulted in reducing the gamma radiation by four more orders of magnitude, so the plutonium-bearing solution now had 100,000-th of the original gamma radiation. The plutonium solution was transferred from the 221 buildings to the 224 buildings, through underground pipes. In the fourth step, phosphoric acid was added and the bismuth phosphate precipitated and removed; potassium permanganate was added to oxidize the plutonium.

In the "crossover" step, the lanthanum fluoride process was used. Lanthanum salts and hydrogen fluoride were added again and lanthanum fluoride was precipitated, while hexavalent plutonium was left in solution. This removed lanthanides like cerium, strontium [sic] and lanthanum, that bismuth phosphate could not. The plutonium was again reduced with oxalic acid and the lanthanum fluoride process was repeated. This time potassium hydroxide was added to metathesize the solution. Liquid was removed with a centrifuge and the solid dissolved in nitric acid to form plutonium nitrate. At this point, a 330-US-gallon (1,200 L) batch sent would have been concentrated to 8 US gallons (30 L).

The final step was carried out at the 231-Z building, where hydrogen peroxide, sulfates and ammonium nitrate were added to the solution and the hexavalent plutonium was precipitated as plutonium peroxide. This was dissolved in nitric acid and put into shipping cans, which were boiled in hot air to produce a plutonium nitrate paste. Each can weighed about 1 kg and was shipped to the Los Alamos Laboratory. Shipments were made in a truck carrying twenty cans and the first arrived at Los Alamos on 2 February 1945. The plutonium was used in the Fat Man bomb design tested in the Trinity nuclear test on 16 July 1945, and in the bombing of Nagasaki on 9 August 1945.

== Decommissioning ==
In 1947, experiments began at Hanford on a new REDOX process using methyl isobutyl ketone (codenamed hexone) as the extractant, which was more efficient. Construction of a new REDOX plant commenced in 1949 and operations began in January 1952, the B plant closing that year. Improvements to the T plant resulted in a 30 percent increase in productivity and improvements were made to the B plant. There were plans to reactivate the B plant but the new PUREX plant that opened in January 1956 was so efficient that the T plant was closed in March 1956 and plans to reactivate the B plant were abandoned. By 1960, the PUREX plant's output had surpassed the combined output of the B and T plants and the REDOX plant.
