= Permanganate index =

Assessment of water quality

The permanganate index is an assessment of water quality. It involves the detection of oxidation by potassium permanganate in an acid medium under hot conditions.

The method is to heat a sample in a boiling water-bath with a known amount of potassium permanganate and sulfuric acid for a fixed period time (10 min). Part of the permanganate will be reduced by oxidizable material in the sample. The consumed permanganate can be determined by addition of an excess of oxalate solution, followed by titration with permanganate. The method applies to waters having a chloride ion concentration of less than 300 mg/L. Samples having a permanganate index over 10 mg/L should be diluted before analysis. The lower limit of the optimum range of the test is 0.5 mg/L.

The permanganate index method is not recommended for waste water because some organic compounds are not oxidized or incompletely oxidized.

== See also ==
- Permanganate
