= Potassium permanganate =

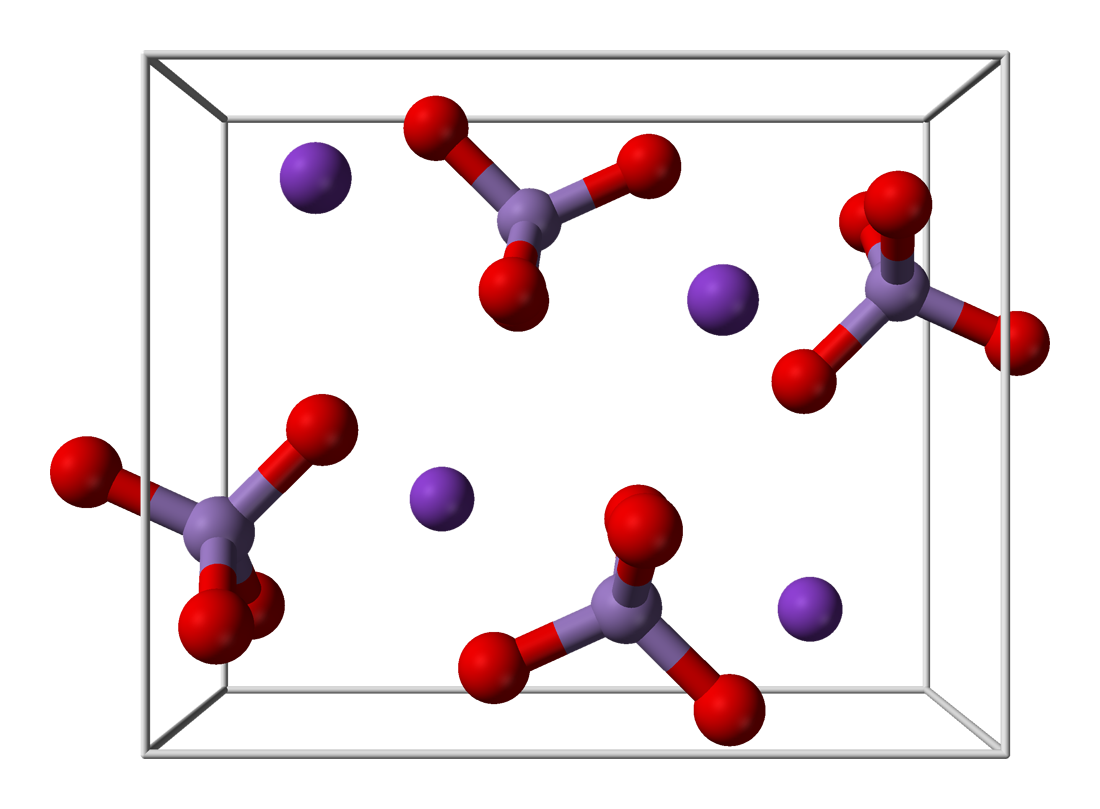

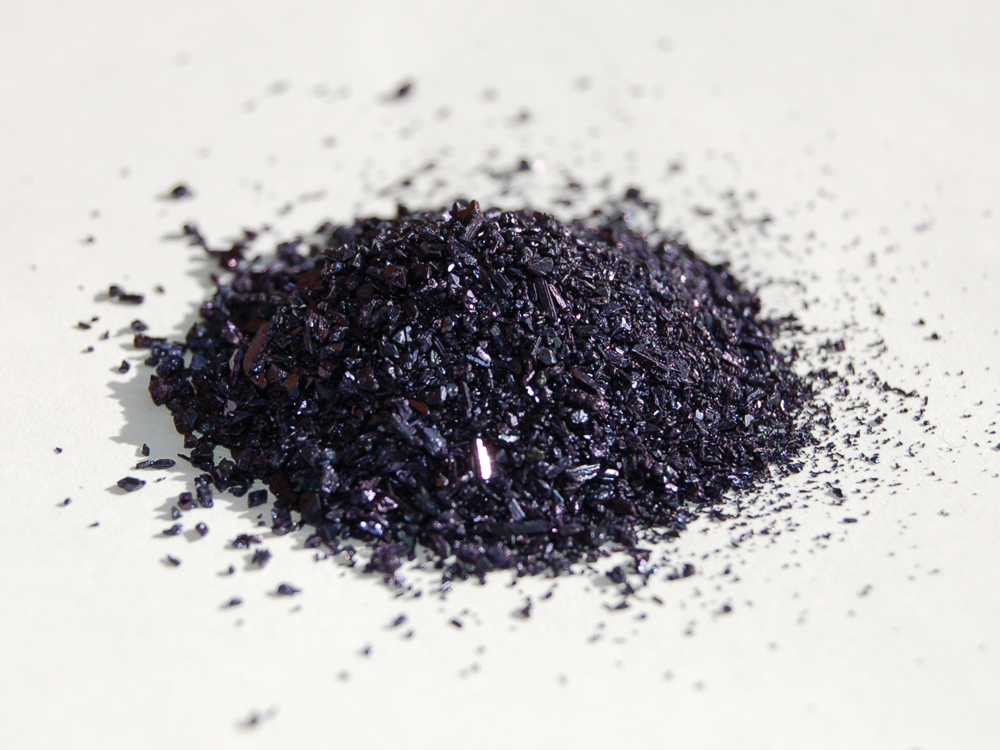

Names
- IUPAC name Potassium manganate(VII)
- Systematic IUPAC name Potassium permanganate
- Other names: Chameleon mineral; Condy's crystals; Permanganate of potash; Hypermangan; Purple potion powder; Permanganic acid, potassium salt; Purple salt

Identifiers
CAS Number	7722-64-7
3D model (JSmol)	Interactive image
ChEBI	CHEBI:231501
ChEMBL	ChEMBL3833305
ChemSpider	22810
DrugBank	DB13831
ECHA InfoCard	100.028.874
EC Number	231-760-3
KEGG	D02053
PubChem CID	516875
RTECS number	SD6475000
UNII	00OT1QX5U4
UN number	1490
CompTox Dashboard (EPA)	DTXSID2034839
- InChI: InChI=1S/K.Mn.4O/q+1;;;;;-1 Key: VZJVWSHVAAUDKD-UHFFFAOYSA-N
- SMILES: [K+].[O-][Mn](=O)(=O)=O

Properties
Chemical formula	KMnO_{4}
Molar mass	158.032 g·mol^{−1}
Appearance	Purplish-bronze-gray needles purple in solution
Odor	odorless
Density	2.7 g/cm^{3}
Melting point	240 °C (464 °F; 513 K) (decomposes)
Solubility in water	76 g/L (25 °C); 250 g/L (65 °C)
Solubility	acetone, methanol
Magnetic susceptibility (χ)	+20.0·10^{−6} cm^{3}/mol
Refractive index (n_{D})	1.59

Structure
Crystal structure	Orthorhombic, oP24
Space group	Pnma, No. 62
Lattice constant	a = 0.909 nm, b = 0.572 nm, c = 0.741 nm
Formula units (Z)	4

Thermochemistry
Heat capacity (C)	119.2 J/mol K
Std molar entropy (S^{⦵}_{298})	171.7 J/(K⋅mol)
Std enthalpy of formation (Δ_{f}H^{⦵}_{298})	−813.4 kJ/mol
Gibbs free energy (Δ_{f}G^{⦵})	−713.8 kJ/mol

Pharmacology
ATC code	D08AX06 (WHO) V03AB18 (WHO)

Hazards
- GHS labelling
Pictograms	(GHS03: Oxidizing) (GHS07: Exclamation mark) (GHS09: Environmental hazard)
NFPA 704 (fire diamond)	2 0 2 OX
- Lethal dose or concentration (LD, LC)
LD_{50} (median dose)	1090 mg/kg (oral, rat)

Related compounds
Other anions	Potassium pertechnetate Potassium perrhenate
Other cations	Sodium permanganate Ammonium permanganate Calcium permanganate Silver permanganate
Related manganates	Potassium hypomanganate Potassium manganate
Related compounds	Manganese heptoxide
- Except where otherwise noted, data are given for materials in their standard state (at 25 °C [77 °F], 100 kPa). verify (what is ?) Infobox references

Potassium permanganate is an inorganic compound with the chemical formula KMnO_{4}. It is a purplish-black crystalline salt, which dissolves in water as K^{+} and MnO_{4}^{−} ions to give an intensely pink to purple solution.

Potassium permanganate is widely used in the chemical industry and laboratories as a strong oxidizing agent, and also traditionally as a medication for dermatitis, for cleaning wounds, and general disinfection. It is on the World Health Organization's List of Essential Medicines. It has a great variety of niche uses such as biocide for water treatment purposes and for tanning and dyeing cloth. In 2025, global potassium permanganate market reached 360,100 metric tons.

It is also referred to as chameleon mineral, Condy's crystals, permanganate of potash, hypermangan, purple potion powder, permanganic acid (potassium salt), and purple salt.

== Properties ==
Potassium permanganate is the potassium salt of the tetrahedral transition metal oxo complex permanganate, in which four O^{2−} ligands are bound to a manganese(VII) center. Potassium permanganate is odorless and slightly sweet and astringent in taste. It is soluble in water, sulfuric acid, acetic anhydride, and benzonitrile, but dissolves best in methanol and acetone.

=== Structure ===
KMnO_{4} forms orthorhombic crystals with constants: a = 910.5 pm, b = 572.0 pm, c = 742.5 pm. The overall motif is similar to that for barium sulfate, with which it forms solid solutions. In the solid (as in solution), each MnO_{4}^{−} centre is tetrahedral. The Mn–O distances are 1.62 Å (162 pm).

=== Color ===
The purplish-black color of solid potassium permanganate, and the intensely pink to purple color of its solutions, is caused by its permanganate anion, which gets its color from a strong charge-transfer absorption band caused by excitation of electrons from oxo ligand orbitals to empty orbitals of the manganese(VII) center. The crystal form can range from purple to black or gray, and has a blue metallic sheen.

== Medical uses ==
Potassium permanganate
Clinical data
- License data: US DailyMed: Potassium_permanganate

Identifiers
- CompTox Dashboard (EPA): DTXSID2034839
- ECHA InfoCard: 100.028.874

=== Mechanism of action ===
Potassium permanganate functions as a strong oxidizing agent. Through this mechanism it results in disinfection, astringency, and reduced odors.

=== Clinical use ===
Potassium permanganate is no longer the preferred treatment for dermatological conditions and no form of it is labeled for human use by the US Food and Drug Administration. It should never be taken internally, because it is highly toxic and corrosive to mucous membranes and skin.

Potassium Permanganate, U.S.P., has a limited topical efficacy against bacteria and fungi. Concentrations of 1:5000 or more are necessary for an effective bactericidal action, but they are irritating to tissues. Consequently, solutions of 1: 10,000 are usually used. However, up to an hour may be required to kill many bacteria, and some strains survive exposure to this concentration. For this reason, permanganate has been made obsolete by much superior antiseptic and antifungal drugs.

— Permanganates, Goodman and Gilman's The Pharmacological Basis of Therapeutics, Sixth Edition (1980), p. 974

Traditionally potassium permanganate was prescribed for a number of skin conditions, including fungal infections of the foot, impetigo, pemphigus, superficial wounds, dermatitis, and topical ulcers. Radioactive contamination of the skin could be cleaned with potassium permanganate and vigorous scrubbing. For topical ulcers it was used together with procaine benzylpenicillin. Typically it was used in skin conditions that produce a lot of liquid. It could be applied as a soaked dressing or a bath. Petroleum jelly may be used on the nails before soaking to prevent their discoloration. For treating eczema, it was recommended using for only a few days at a time due to irritating the skin.

The US Food and Drug Administration does not recommend its use in the crystal or tablet form. It should only be used in a diluted liquid form.

=== Historical use ===
Potassium permanganate was first made in the 1600s and came into common medical use at least as early as the 1800s. During World War I Canadian soldiers were given potassium permanganate (to be applied mixed with an ointment) in an effort to prevent sexually transmitted infections. Some have attempted to bring about an abortion by putting it in the vagina, though this is not effective. Other historical uses have included an effort to wash out the stomach in those with strychnine or picrotoxin poisoning.

=== Side effects ===
Side effects from topical use include irritation of the skin and discoloration of clothing. A harsh burn on a child from an undissolved tablet has been reported. Higher concentration solutions can result in chemical burns. Therefore, in 2015 the British National Formulary recommended 100 mg be dissolved in a liter of water before use to form a 1:10,000 (0.01%) solution. Wrapping the dressings soaked with potassium permanganate is not recommended.

=== Toxicology ===
Potassium permanganate is toxic if taken by mouth. Concentrated solutions when drunk have resulted in acute respiratory distress syndrome or swelling of the airway. Effects may include nausea, vomiting, and shortness of breath. If a sufficiently large amount (about 10 grams) is eaten death may occur. Concentrated solutions of potassium permanganate and repeated exposure cause skin corrosion and dermatitis.

Recommended measures for those who have ingested potassium permanganate include gastroscopy. Activated charcoal or medications to cause vomiting are not recommended. While medications like ranitidine and acetylcysteine may be used in toxicity, evidence for this use is poor.

=== Pharmaceuticals ===
In the United States the FDA requires tablets of the medication to be sold by prescription. Potassium permanganate, however, does not have FDA approved uses and therefore non medical grade potassium permanganate is sometimes used for medical purposes.

It is available under a number of brand names including Permasol, Koi Med Tricho-Ex, and Kalii permanganas RFF. It is occasionally called "Condy's crystals".

=== Veterinary medicine ===
Potassium permanganate may be used to prevent the spread of glanders among horses.

== Industrial and other uses ==
Almost all applications of potassium permanganate exploit its oxidizing properties. As a strong oxidant that does not generate toxic byproducts, KMnO_{4} has many niche uses.

=== Water treatment ===
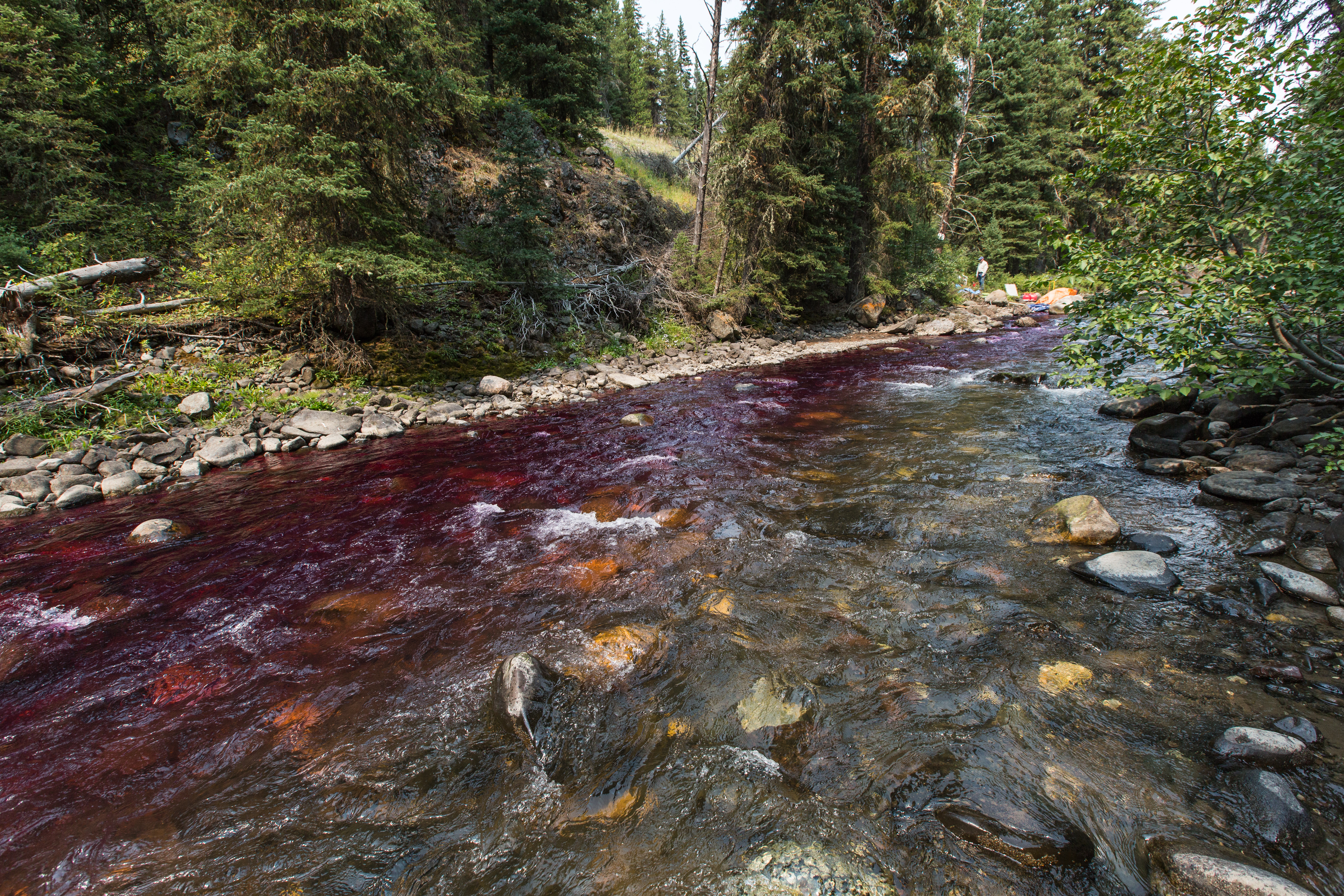
Potassium permanganate colors the water purple and neutralizes rotenone treatment in Soda Butte Creek.

Potassium permanganate is used extensively in the water treatment industry. It is used to remove iron and hydrogen sulfide (rotten egg smell) from well water via a "manganese greensand" filter. "Pot-Perm" is also obtainable at pool supply stores and is used additionally to treat wastewater. Historically it was used to disinfect drinking water, though the EPA considers it a poor disinfectant. It can turn water a fuchsia or pink color. Modern hiking and survivalist guides advise against using potassium permanganate in the field because it is difficult to dose correctly.

==== Fisheries and aquatic management ====
Potassium permanganate is not FDA approved for use with food fish in the United States, however it is categorized under "regulatory action deferred" and is legal to use because the FDA considers it "low regulatory priority" and at low risk for adverse human health effects.

Potassium permanganate is a treatment for Ichthyophthirius multifiliis (commonly known as "ich") and protozoa (such as Trichodina), which infect and usually kill freshwater aquarium fish. A minimum dose of 2 ppm is required. Water with more organic load and a higher number of organisms including algae requires more permanganate. High concentrations and use more than once per week kill fish. Food fish require a 7-day period after treatment before they can be consumed.

An alternative application is in the control of nuisance organisms such as zebra mussels in freshwater collection and treatment systems.

Rotenone can be deactivated in water with the use of potassium permanganate to lower toxicity to acceptable levels. A 1:1 ratio of permanganate to rotenone is insufficient to deactivate rotenone in most situations.

=== Synthesis of organic compounds ===
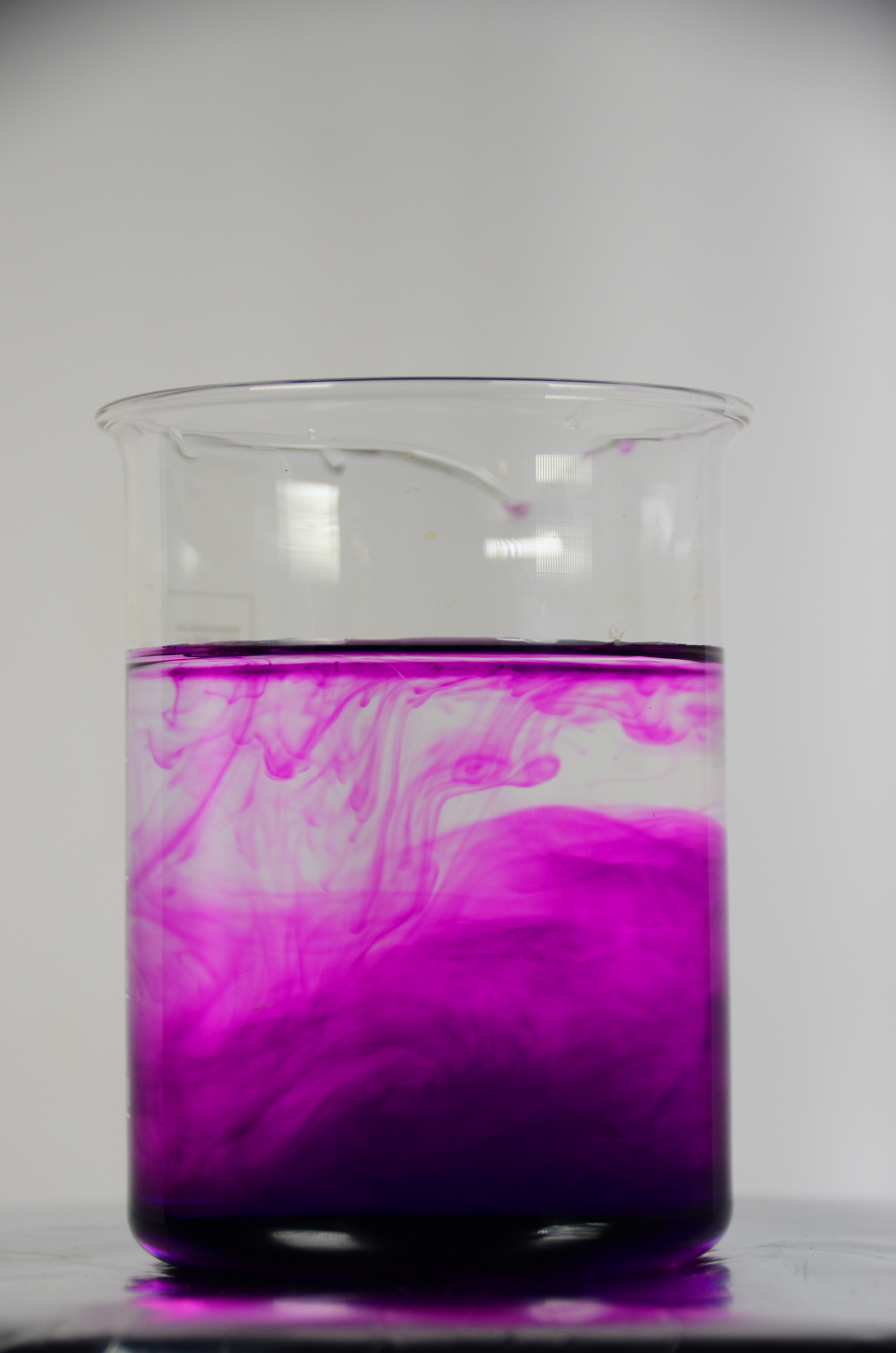
KMnO_{4} in water

KMnO_{4} is a reagent for the synthesis of organic compounds. Significant amounts are used in the commercial synthesis of ascorbic acid, chloramphenicol, saccharin, isonicotinic acid, and pyrazinoic acid.

KMnO_{4} is used in qualitative organic analysis to test for the presence of unsaturation. It is sometimes referred to as Baeyer's reagent after the German organic chemist Adolf von Baeyer. The reagent is an alkaline solution of potassium permanganate. Reaction with double or triple bonds (R_{2}C=CR_{2} or R−C≡C−R) causes the color to fade from purplish-pink to brown. Aldehydes and formic acid (and formates) also give a positive test. The test is antiquated.

Baeyer's reagent reaction

KMnO_{4} solution is a common thin layer chromatography (TLC) stain for the detection of oxidizable functional groups, such as alcohols, aldehydes, alkenes, and ketones. Such compounds result in a white to orange spot on TLC plates.

=== Analytical use ===
Potassium permanganate can be used to quantitatively determine the total oxidizable organic material in an aqueous sample. The value determined is known as the permanganate value. In analytical chemistry, a standardized aqueous solution of KMnO_{4} is sometimes used as an oxidizing titrant for redox titrations (permanganometry). As potassium permanganate is titrated, the solution becomes a light shade of purple, which darkens as excess of the titrant is added to the solution. In a related way, it is used as a reagent to determine the Kappa number of wood pulp. For the standardization of KMnO_{4} solutions, reduction by oxalic acid is often used. In agricultural chemistry, it is used for estimation of active carbon in soil.

Aqueous, acidic solutions of KMnO_{4} are used to collect gaseous mercury in flue gas during stationary source emissions testing.

In histology, potassium permanganate was used as a bleaching agent.

=== Fruit preservation ===
Ethylene absorbents extend storage time of bananas even at high temperatures. This effect can be exploited by packing bananas in polyethylene together with potassium permanganate. By removing ethylene by oxidation, the permanganate delays the ripening, increasing the fruit's shelf life up to 4 weeks without the need for refrigeration.

The chemical reaction, in which ethylene (C_{2}H_{4}) is oxidised by potassium permanganate (KMnO_{4}) to carbon dioxide (CO_{2}), manganese oxide (MnO_{2}) and potassium hydroxide (KOH), in the presence of water, is presented as follows:

3 C_{2}H_{4} + 12 KMnO_{4} → 6 CO_{2} + 12 MnO_{2} + 12 KOH

=== Survival kits ===
Potassium permanganate is sometimes included in survival kits: as a hypergolic fire starter (when mixed with glycerol, or a substance containing it such as antifreeze from a car radiator); as a water sterilizer; and for creating distress signals on snow. Modern hiking and survivalist guides advise against using potassium permanganate in the field because it is difficult to dose correctly.

=== Fire service ===
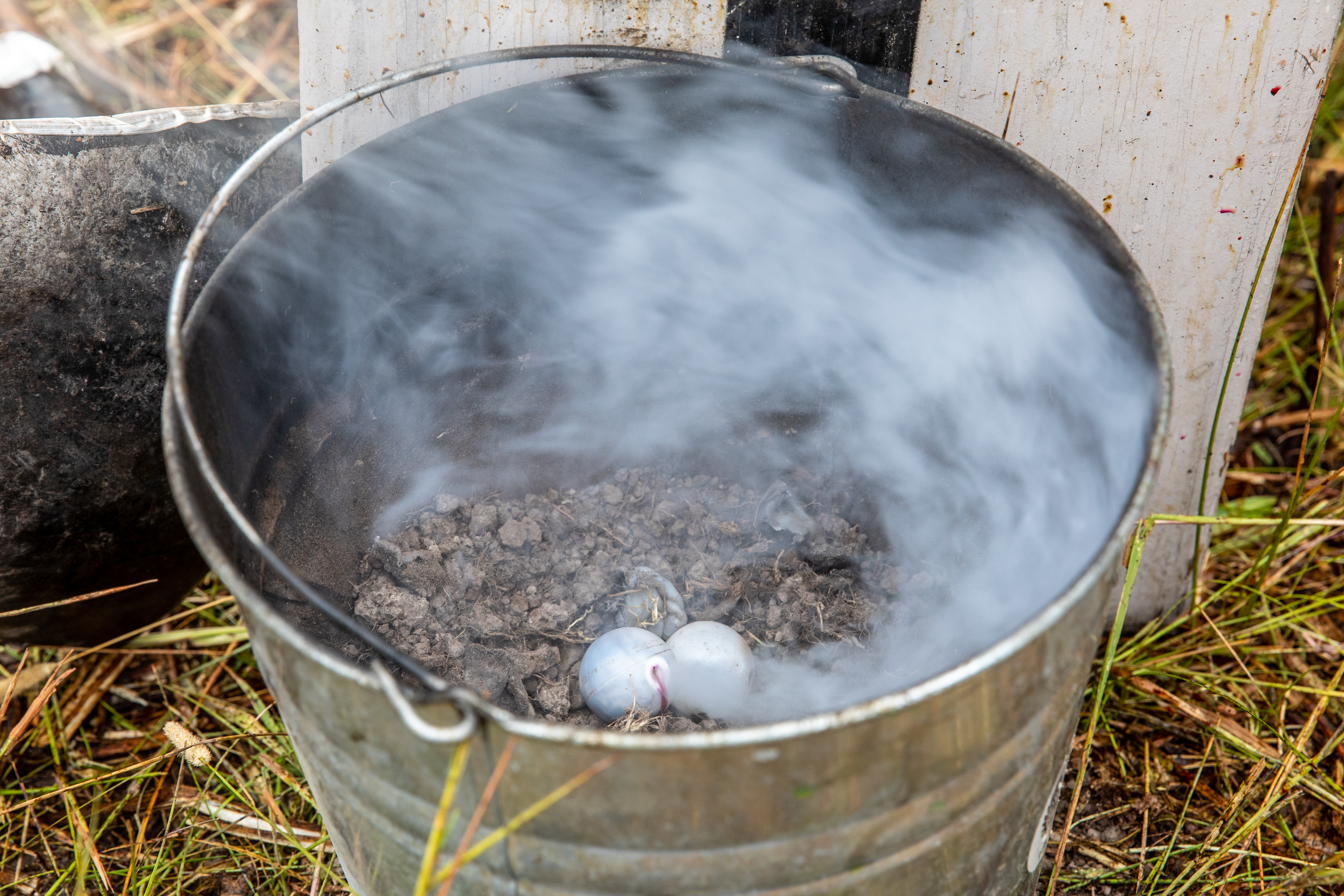
Delayed aerial ignition devices containing potassium permanganate.

Potassium permanganate is added to "plastic sphere dispensers" to create backfires, burnouts, and controlled burns. Polymer spheres resembling ping-pong balls containing small amounts of permanganate are injected with ethylene glycol and projected towards the area where ignition is desired, where they spontaneously ignite seconds later. Both handheld helicopter- unmanned aircraft systems (UAS) or boat-mounted plastic sphere dispensers are used.

=== Other uses ===
Potassium permanganate is one of the principal chemicals used in the film and television industries to "age" props and set dressings. Its ready conversion to brown MnO_{2} creates "hundred-year-old" or "ancient" looks on hessian cloth (burlap), ropes, timber and glass.

Potassium permanganate is used as an oxidizing agent in the synthesis of cocaine and methcathinone. It can purify cocaine paste with oxidization to increase its stability. This led to the Drug Enforcement Administration launching Operation Purple in 2000, with the goal of monitoring the world supply of potassium permanganate; however, potassium permanganate derivatives and substitutes were soon used thereafter to avoid the operation.

== History ==
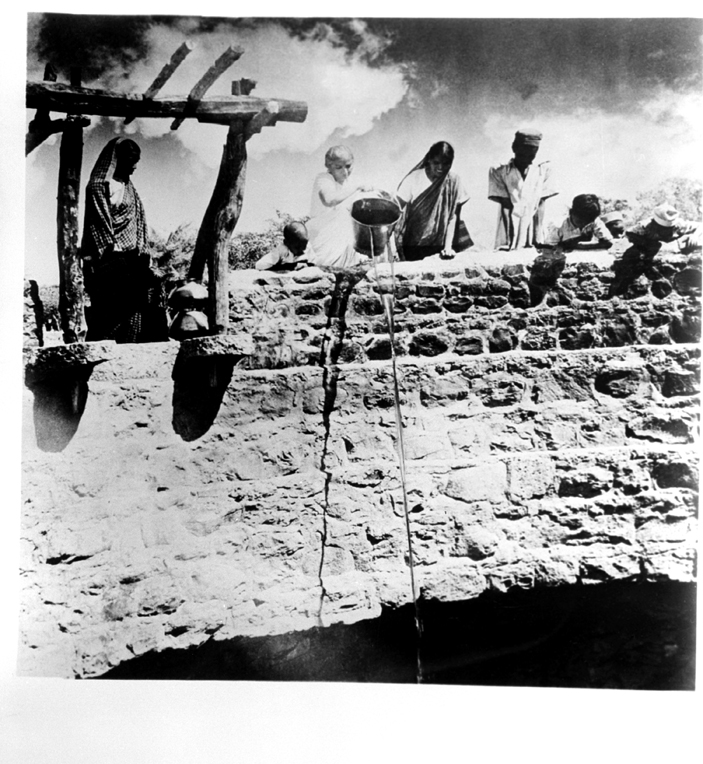
Treating a well with potassium permanganate in India (1949).

In 1659, Johann Rudolf Glauber fused a mixture of the mineral pyrolusite (manganese dioxide, MnO_{2}) and potassium carbonate to obtain a material that, when dissolved in water, gave a green solution (potassium manganate) which slowly shifted to violet and then finally red. The reaction that produced the color changes that Glauber observed in his solution of potassium permanganate and potassium manganate (K_{2}MnO_{4}) is now known as the "chemical chameleon".

The case of the chameleon mineral alludes to a broader reflection on how epistemological framework dictates what early modern scientists perceived as meaningful discoveries. Little literature exists on Glauber's accidental discovery of potassium permanganate and the importance of both its dismissal and its conversion into a modern medical and hygienic staple.

The earliest description of the production of potassium permanganate is here. Just under 200 years later, London chemist Henry Bollmann Condy had an interest in disinfectants; he found that fusing pyrolusite with sodium hydroxide (NaOH) and dissolving it in water produced a solution with disinfectant properties. He patented this solution, and marketed it as 'Condy's Fluid'. Although effective, the solution was not very stable. This was overcome by using potassium hydroxide (KOH) rather than NaOH. This was more stable, and had the advantage of easy conversion to the equally effective potassium permanganate crystals. This crystalline material was known as 'Condy's crystals' or 'Condy's powder'. Potassium permanganate was comparatively easy to manufacture, so Condy was subsequently forced to spend considerable time in litigation to stop competitors from marketing similar products. According to Varlam Shalamov, potassium permanganate solution was used as a catch-all treatment for dysentery, frostbite and ulcers in the Gulag camps of Kolyma.

Early photographers used it as a component of flash powder. It is now replaced with other oxidizers, due to the instability of permanganate mixtures.

== Preparation ==
Potassium permanganate is produced industrially from manganese dioxide, which also occurs as the mineral pyrolusite. In 2000, worldwide production was estimated at 30,000 tonnes. The MnO_{2} is fused with potassium hydroxide and heated in air or with another source of oxygen, like potassium nitrate or potassium chlorate. This process gives potassium manganate:

2 MnO_{2} + 4 KOH + O_{2} → 2 K_{2}MnO_{4} + 2 H_{2}O

With sodium hydroxide, the end product is not sodium manganate but a Mn(V) compound, which is one reason why the potassium permanganate is more commonly used than sodium permanganate. Furthermore, the potassium salt crystallizes better.

The potassium manganate is then converted into permanganate by electrolytic oxidation in alkaline media:

2 K_{2}MnO_{4} + 2 H_{2}O → 2 KMnO_{4} + 2 KOH + H_{2}

=== Other methods ===
Although of no commercial importance, potassium manganate can be oxidized by chlorine or by disproportionation under acidic conditions. The chlorine oxidation reaction is

2 K_{2}MnO_{4} + Cl_{2} → 2 KMnO_{4} + 2 KCl

and the acid-induced disproportionation reaction may be written as

3 K_{2}MnO_{4} + 4 HCl → 2 KMnO_{4} + MnO_{2} + 2 H_{2}O + 4 KCl

A weak acid such as carbonic acid is sufficient for this reaction:

3 K_{2}MnO_{4} + 2 CO_{2} → 2 KMnO_{4} + 2 K_{2}CO_{3} + MnO_{2}

Permanganate salts may also be generated by treating a solution of Mn^{2+} ions with strong oxidants such as lead dioxide (PbO_{2}), sodium bismuthate (NaBiO_{3}), or peroxydisulfate. Tests for the presence of manganese exploit the vivid violet color of permanganate produced by these reagents.

== Reactions ==
=== Organic chemistry ===
Dilute solutions of KMnO_{4} convert alkenes into diols. This behaviour is also used as a qualitative test for the presence of double or triple bonds in a molecule, since the reaction decolorizes the initially purple permanganate solution and generates a brown precipitate (MnO_{2}). In this context, it is sometimes called Baeyer's reagent. However, bromine serves better in measuring unsaturation (double or triple bonds) quantitatively, since KMnO_{4}, being a very strong oxidizing agent, can react with a variety of groups.

Under acidic conditions, the alkene double bond is cleaved to give the appropriate carboxylic acid:

CH_{3}(CH_{2})_{17}CH=CH_{2} + 2 KMnO_{4} + 3 H_{2}SO_{4} → CH_{3}(CH_{2})_{17}COOH + CO_{2} + 4 H_{2}O + K_{2}SO_{4} + 2 MnSO_{4}

Potassium permanganate oxidizes aldehydes to carboxylic acids, illustrated by the conversion of n-heptanal to heptanoic acid:

5 C_{6}H_{13}CHO + 2 KMnO_{4} + 3 H_{2}SO_{4} → 5 C_{6}H_{13}COOH + 3 H_{2}O + K_{2}SO_{4} + 2 MnSO_{4}

Even an alkyl group (with a benzylic hydrogen) on an aromatic ring is oxidized, e.g. toluene to benzoic acid.

5 C_{6}H_{5}CH_{3} + 6 KMnO_{4} + 9 H_{2}SO_{4} → 5 C_{6}H_{5}COOH + 14 H_{2}O + 3 K_{2}SO_{4} + 6 MnSO_{4}

Glycols and polyols are highly reactive toward KMnO_{4}. For example, addition of potassium permanganate to an aqueous solution of sugar and sodium hydroxide produces the chemical chameleon reaction, which involves dramatic color changes associated with the various oxidation states of manganese. A related vigorous reaction is exploited as a fire starter in survival kits. For example, a mixture of potassium permanganate and glycerol or pulverized glucose ignites readily. Its sterilizing properties are another reason for inclusion of KMnO_{4} in a survival kit.

=== Ion exchange ===
Treating a mixture of aqueous potassium permanganate with a quaternary ammonium salt results in ion exchange, precipitating the quat salt of permanganate. Solutions of these salts are sometimes soluble in organic solvents:

KMnO_{4} + R_{4}NCl → R_{4}NMnO_{4} + KCl

Similarly, addition of a crown ether also gives a lipophilic salt.

=== Reaction with acids and bases ===
Permanganate reacts with concentrated hydrochloric acid to give chlorine and manganese(II):

2 KMnO_{4} + 16 HCl → 2 MnCl_{2} + 5 Cl_{2} + 2 KCl + 8 H_{2}O

In neutral solution, permanganate slowly reduces to manganese dioxide (MnO_{2}). This is the material that stains one's skin when handling KMnO_{4}.

KMnO_{4} reduces in alkaline solution to give green K_{2}MnO_{4}:

4 KMnO_{4} + 4 KOH → 4 K_{2}MnO_{4} + O_{2} + 2 H_{2}O

This reaction illustrates the relatively rare role of hydroxide as a reducing agent.

Addition of concentrated sulfuric acid to potassium permanganate gives Mn_{2}O_{7}. Although no reaction may be apparent, the vapor over the mixture will ignite paper impregnated with alcohol. Potassium permanganate and sulfuric acid react to produce some ozone, which has a high oxidizing power and rapidly oxidizes the alcohol, causing it to combust. As the reaction also produces explosive Mn_{2}O_{7}, this should only be attempted with great caution.

=== Thermal decomposition ===
Solid potassium permanganate decomposes when heated:

2 KMnO_{4} → K_{2}MnO_{4} + MnO_{2} + O_{2}

It is a redox reaction.

== Safety and handling ==
Potassium permanganate poses risks as a strong oxidizer. Contact with skin can cause skin irritation, skin and mucous membrane corrosion, and in some cases severe allergic reaction. It is poisonous to humans and animals, and ingestion may lead to respiratory failure. It is incompatible with organic and readily oxidized materials and poses a violent reaction and explosion hazard. It is flammable during some chemical reactions and emits toxic fumes when burning.

It can also result in discoloration and clothing stains.
