= Silver permanganate =

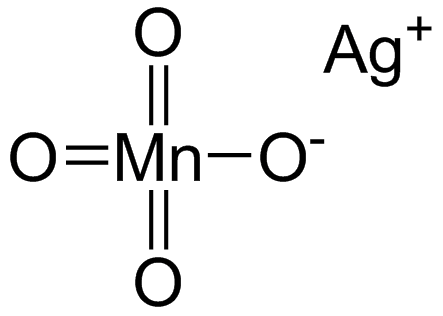

Names
- IUPAC name Silver(I) permanganate
- Systematic IUPAC name Silver(I) manganate(VII)
- Other names Argentous permanganate

Identifiers
CAS Number	7783-98-4
3D model (JSmol)	Interactive image
ChemSpider	9599554
ECHA InfoCard	100.029.127
EC Number	232-040-1
PubChem CID	11424678
UNII	A61162P82P
CompTox Dashboard (EPA)	DTXSID10228455
- InChI: InChI=1S/Ag.Mn.4O/q+1;;;;;-1 Key: FBDQITNNUANGAD-UHFFFAOYSA-N; InChI=1/Ag.Mn.4O/q+1;;;;;-1/rAg.MnO4/c;2-1(3,4)5/q+1;-1 Key: FBDQITNNUANGAD-URBVJNAFAD
- SMILES: [Ag+].[O-][Mn](=O)(=O)=O

Properties
Chemical formula	AgMnO_{4}
Molar mass	226.804 g/mol
Appearance	purple crystals or gray powder
Density	4.27 g/cm^{3}
Melting point	160 °C (320 °F; 433 K) (decomposes)
Solubility in water	0.55 g/100 mL (0 °C); 1.69 g/100 mL (30 °C)
Magnetic susceptibility (χ)	−63.0·10^{−6} cm^{3}/mol

Structure
Crystal structure	monoclinic

Hazards
- Occupational safety and health (OHS/OSH)
Main hazards	Eye irritant
- GHS labelling
Pictograms	(GHS03: Oxidizing) (GHS07: Exclamation mark)
Signal word	Warning
Hazard statements	H272, H312, H319, H332
Precautionary statements	P210, P220, P261, P264, P270, P271, P280, P301+P310, P302+P352, P304+P340, P305+P351+P338, P311, P321, P330, P337+P313, P362+P364, P370+P378, P501
- Except where otherwise noted, data are given for materials in their standard state (at 25 °C [77 °F], 100 kPa). Infobox references

Silver permanganate is an inorganic compound with the chemical formula AgMnO_{4}. This salt is a purple crystal adopting a monoclinic crystal system. It decomposes when heated or mixed with water, and heating to high temperature may lead to explosion.

== Production ==
It can be produced through the reaction of silver nitrate and potassium permanganate:

AgNO_{3} + KMnO_{4} → AgMnO_{4} + KNO_{3}

== Uses ==
Silver permanganate is an oxidizing agent for carbon monoxide when deposited on metallic oxide carriers. As a result, it was investigated for use in gas masks but was ultimately abandoned due to its expense and it being consumed in the reaction rather than acting as a catalyst.

== Related compounds ==
A caesium silver permanganate with the formula Cs_{3}Ag[MnO_{4}]_{4} has been characterized.
