= Sodium permanganate =

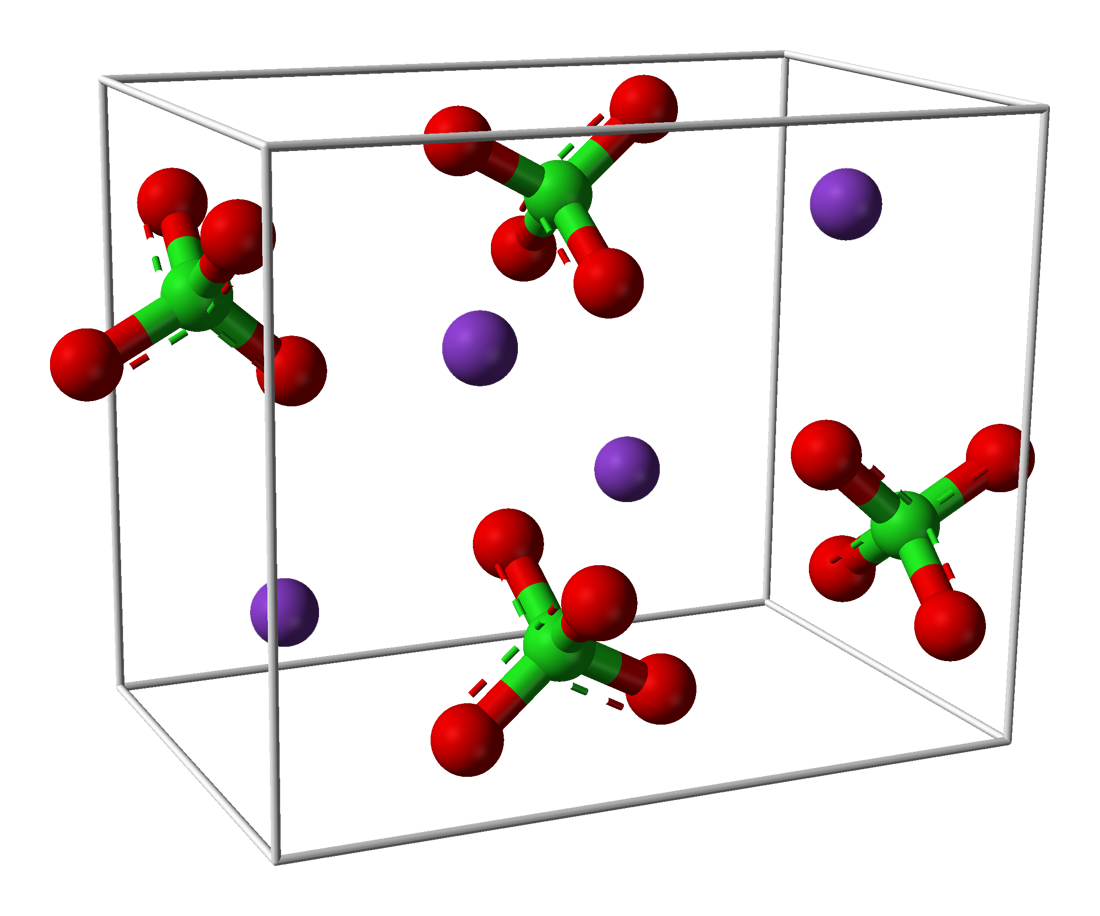

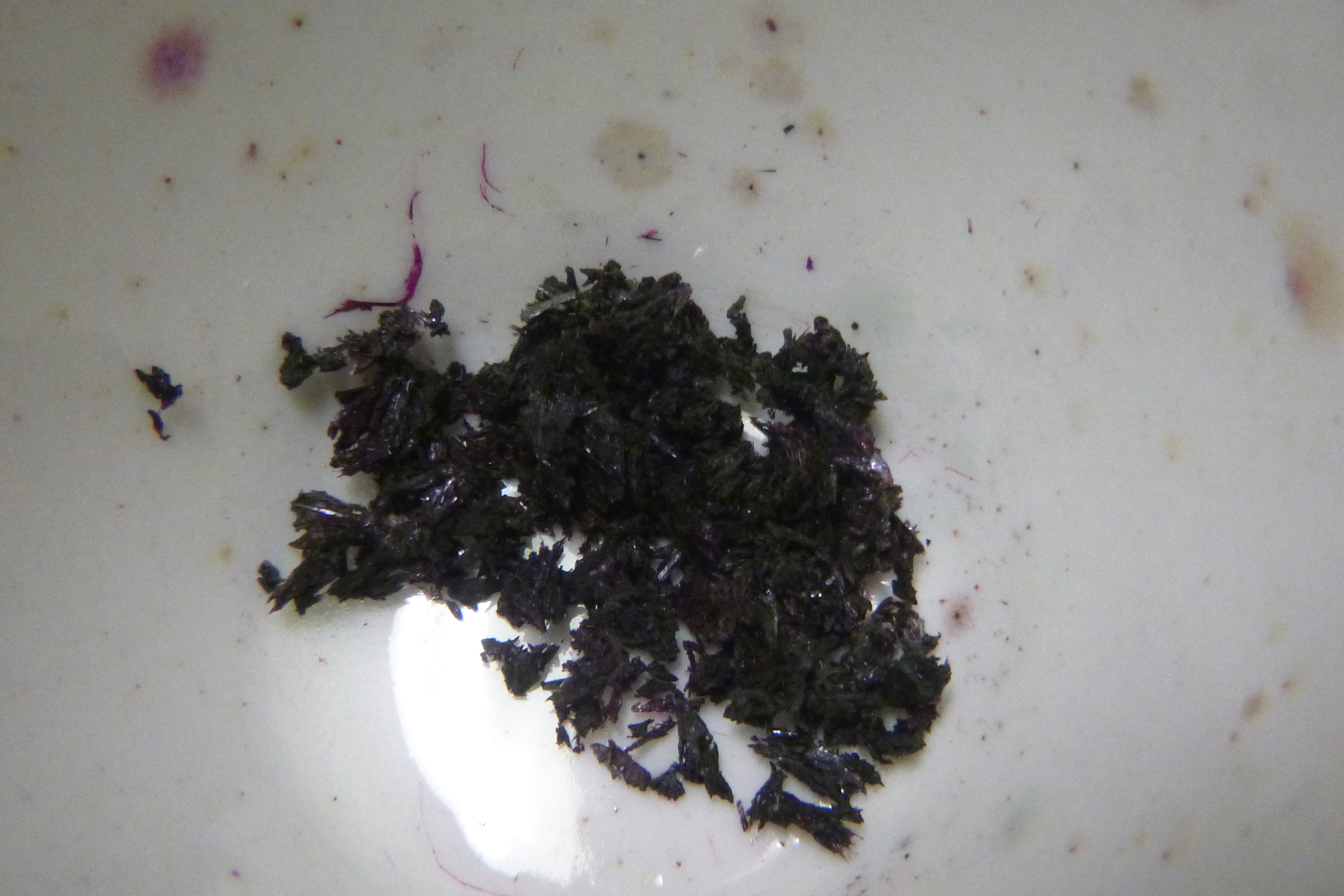

Names
- IUPAC name Sodium manganate(VII)
- Other names Sodium permanganate, permanganate of sodium

Identifiers
| CAS Number | 10101-50-5 |
| 3D model (JSmol) | Interactive image |
| ChemSpider | 23303 |
| ECHA InfoCard | 100.030.215 |
| PubChem CID | 23673458 |
| RTECS number | SD6650000 |
| UNII | IZ5356R281 |
| CompTox Dashboard (EPA) | DTXSID2051504 |
- InChI: InChI=1S/Mn.Na.4O/q;+1;;;;-1 Key: WPWYHBSOACXYBB-UHFFFAOYSA-N; InChI=1/Mn.Na.4O/q;+1;;;;-1/rMnO4.Na/c2-1(3,4)5;/q-1;+1 Key: WPWYHBSOACXYBB-NJUWVQTAAZ
- SMILES: [Na+].[O-][Mn](=O)(=O)=O

Properties
| Chemical formula | NaMnO_{4} |
| Molar mass | 141.9254 g/mol 159.94 g/mol (monohydrate) |
| Appearance | Red solid |
| Density | 1.972 g/cm^{3} (monohydrate) |
| Melting point | 36 °C (97 °F; 309 K) (170 °C for trihydrate) |
| Solubility in water | 90 g/100 mL |

Hazards
- Occupational safety and health (OHS/OSH)
| Main hazards | Oxidizer |
- Except where otherwise noted, data are given for materials in their standard state (at 25 °C [77 °F], 100 kPa). verify (what is ?) Infobox references

Sodium permanganate is the inorganic compound with the formula NaMnO_{4}. It is closely related to the more commonly encountered potassium permanganate, but it is generally less desirable, because it is more expensive to produce. It is mainly available as the monohydrate. This salt absorbs water from the atmosphere and has a low melting point. Being about 15 times more soluble than KMnO_{4}, sodium permanganate finds some applications where very high concentrations of MnO_{4}^{−} are sought.

== Preparation and properties ==
Sodium permanganate cannot be prepared analogously to the route to KMnO_{4} because the required intermediate manganate salt, Na_{2}MnO_{4}, does not form. Thus less direct routes are used including conversion from KMnO_{4}.

Sodium permanganate behaves similarly to potassium permanganate. It dissolves readily in water to give deep purple solutions, evaporation of which gives prismatic purple-black glistening crystals of the monohydrate NaMnO_{4}·H_{2}O. The potassium salt does not form a hydrate. Because of its hygroscopic nature, it is less useful in analytical chemistry than its potassium counterpart.

It can be prepared by the reaction of manganese dioxide with sodium hypochlorite:

2 MnO_{2} + 3 NaClO + 2 NaOH → 2 NaMnO_{4} + 3 NaCl + H_{2}O

== Applications ==
Because of its high solubility, its aqueous solutions are used as a drilled hole debris remover and etchant in printed circuitry, with a limited utility though. It is gaining popularity in water treatment for taste, odor, and zebra mussel control. The V-2 rocket used it in combination with hydrogen peroxide to drive a steam turbopump.

As an oxidizer, sodium permanganate is used in environmental remediation of soil and groundwater contaminated with chlorinated solvents using the remediation technology in situ chemical oxidation, also referred to as ISCO.
