= Potassium manganate =

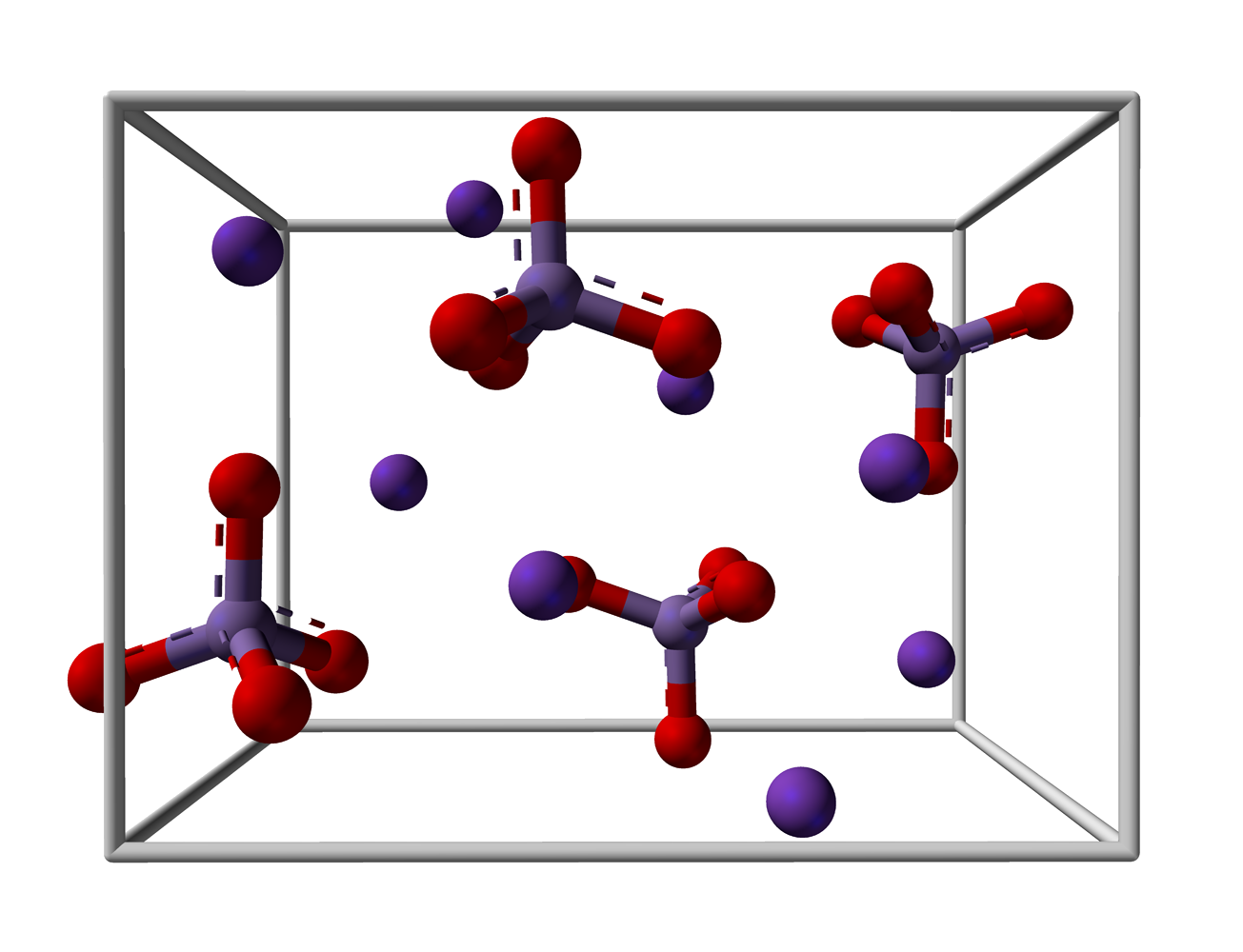

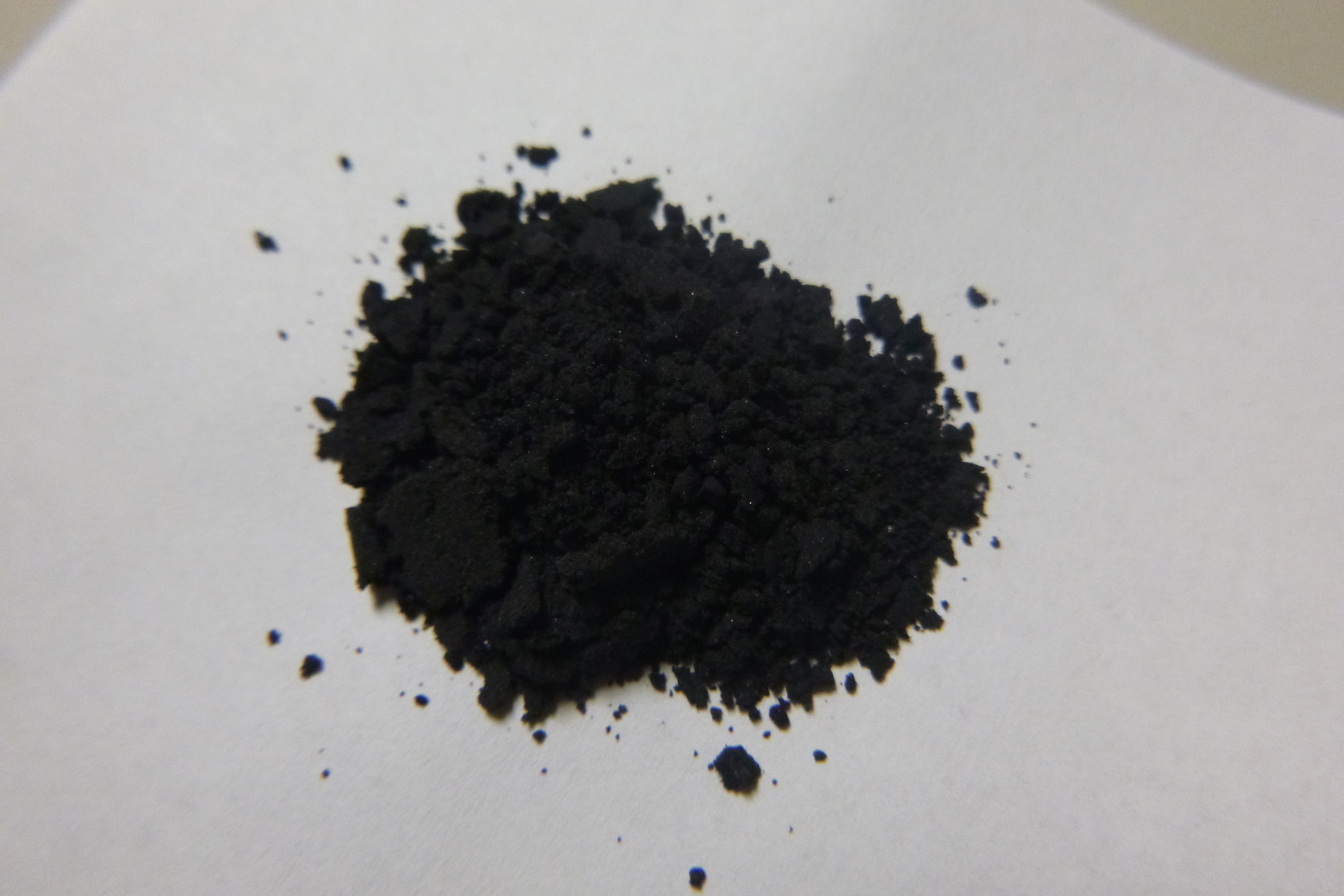

Names
- IUPAC names Potassium manganate Potassium manganate(VI)

Identifiers
| CAS Number | 10294-64-1 |
| 3D model (JSmol) | Interactive image |
| ChemSpider | 141385 |
| ECHA InfoCard | 100.030.592 |
| EC Number | 233-665-2 |
| PubChem CID | 160931 |
| UNII | 5PI213D3US |
| CompTox Dashboard (EPA) | DTXSID10893107 |
- InChI: Key: XKYFHUXZPRFUTH-UHFFFAOYSA-N; InChI=1S/2K.Mn.4O/q2*+1;;;;2*-1
- SMILES: [O-][Mn](=O)(=O)[O-].[K+].[K+]

Properties
| Chemical formula | K_{2}MnO_{4} |
| Molar mass | 197.132 g/mol |
| Appearance | green crystals (darkening with time) |
| Density | 2.78 g/cm^{3}, solid |
| Melting point | 190 °C (374 °F; 463 K) (decomposition) |
| Solubility in water | decomposes |
| Acidity (pK_{a}) | 7.1 |

Structure
| Crystal structure | isomorphous with K_{2}SO_{4} |
| Coordination geometry | tetrahedral anion |

Hazards
- Occupational safety and health (OHS/OSH)
| Main hazards | oxidizer |
- GHS labelling
| Pictograms | (GHS03: Oxidizing) (GHS07: Exclamation mark) |
| Signal word | Warning |
| Hazard statements | H272, H315, H319, H335 |
| Precautionary statements | P210, P220, P221, P261, P264, P271, P280, P302+P352, P304+P340, P305+P351+P338, P312, P321, P332+P313, P337+P313, P362, P370+P378, P403+P233, P405, P501 |
| NFPA 704 (fire diamond) | 1 0 1 OX |

Related compounds
| Related compounds | Potassium permanganate Manganese dioxide Potassium chromate Potassium ferrate |
- Except where otherwise noted, data are given for materials in their standard state (at 25 °C [77 °F], 100 kPa). verify (what is ?) Infobox references

Potassium manganate is the inorganic compound with the formula K_{2}MnO_{4}. This green-colored salt is an intermediate in the industrial synthesis of potassium permanganate (KMnO_{4}), a common chemical. Occasionally, potassium manganate and potassium permanganate are confused, but each compound's properties are distinct.

== Structure and bonding ==
K_{2}MnO_{4} is a salt, consisting of K^{+} cations and MnO^{2−}_{4} anions. X-ray crystallography shows that the anion is tetrahedral, with Mn-O distances of 1.66 Å, ca. 0.03 Å longer than the Mn-O distances in KMnO_{4}. It is isostructural with potassium sulfate. The compound is paramagnetic, owing to the presence of one unpaired electron on the Mn(VI) center.

== Synthesis ==
The industrial route entails treatment of MnO_{2} with air and potassium hydroxide:

2 MnO_{2} + 4 KOH + O_{2} → 2 K_{2}MnO_{4} + 2 H_{2}O

The transformation gives a green-colored melt. Alternatively, instead of using air, potassium nitrate can be used as the oxidizer:

2 KOH + KNO_{3} + MnO_{2} → K_{2}MnO_{4} + H_{2}O + KNO_{2}

One can test an unknown substance for the presence of manganese by heating the sample in strong KOH in air. The production of a green coloration indicates the presence of Mn. This green color results from an intense absorption at 610 nm.

In the laboratory, K_{2}MnO_{4} can be synthesized by heating a solution of KMnO_{4} in concentrated KOH solution followed by cooling to give green crystals:

4 KMnO_{4} + 4 KOH → 4 K_{2}MnO_{4} + O_{2} + 2 H_{2}O

This reaction illustrates the relatively rare role of hydroxide as a reducing agent. The concentration of K_{2}MnO_{4} in such solutions can be checked by measuring their absorbance at 610 nm.

The one-electron reduction of permanganate to manganate can also be effected using iodide as the reducing agent:

2 KMnO_{4} + 2 KI → 2 K_{2}MnO_{4} + I_{2}

The conversion is signaled by the color change from purple, characteristic of permanganate, to the green color of manganate. This reaction also shows that manganate(VII) can serve as an electron acceptor in addition to its usual role as an oxygen-transfer reagent. Barium manganate, BaMnO_{4}, is generated by the reduction of KMnO_{4} with iodide in the presence of barium chloride. Just like BaSO_{4}, BaMnO_{4} exhibits low solubility in virtually all solvents.

An easy method for preparing potassium manganate in the laboratory involves heating crystals or powder of pure potassium permanganate. Potassium permanganate will decompose into potassium manganate, manganese dioxide and oxygen gas:

2 KMnO_{4} → K_{2}MnO_{4} + MnO_{2} + O_{2}

This reaction is a laboratory method to prepare oxygen, but produces samples of potassium manganate contaminated with MnO_{2}. The former is soluble and the latter is not.

== Reactions ==
Manganate salts readily disproportionate to permanganate ion and manganese dioxide:

3 K_{2}MnO_{4} + 2 H_{2}O → 2 KMnO_{4} + MnO_{2} + 4 KOH

The colorful nature of the disproportionation has led the manganate/manganate(VII) pair to be referred to as a chemical chameleon. This disproportionation reaction, which becomes rapid when [OH^{−}] < 1M, follows bimolecular kinetics.

== See also ==
- Category:Manganates for a list.

== Sources ==
- Holleman, A. F.; Wiberg, E. "Inorganic Chemistry" Academic Press: San Diego, 2001. ISBN 0-12-352651-5.
