= Manganese dioxide =

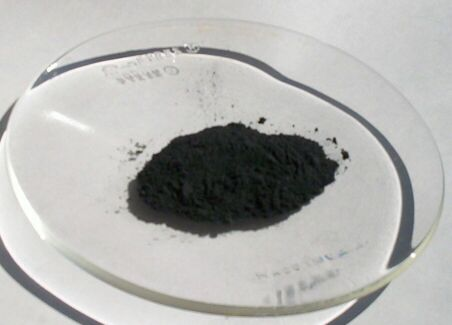
- Manganese(IV) oxideMn4O2

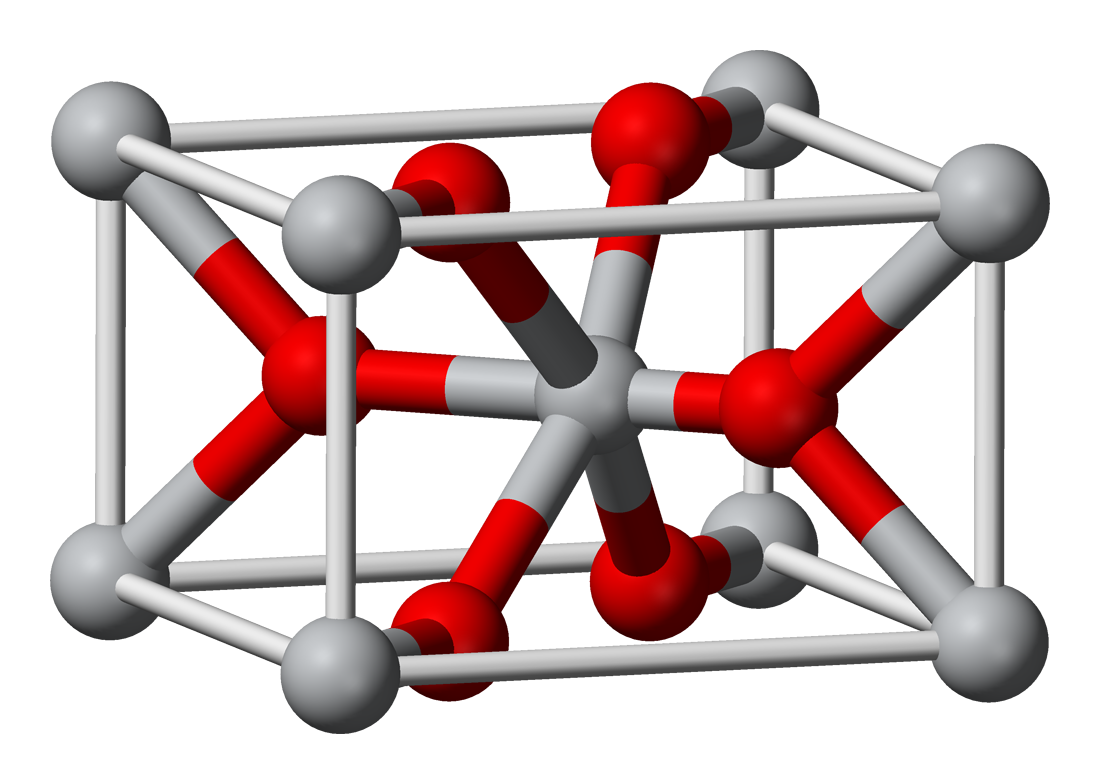

Names
- IUPAC names Manganese dioxide Manganese(IV) oxide
- Other names Pyrolusite, hyperoxide of manganese, black oxide of manganese, manganic oxide

Identifiers
CAS Number	1313-13-9
3D model (JSmol)	Interactive image
ChEBI	CHEBI:136511
ChemSpider	14117
ECHA InfoCard	100.013.821
EC Number	215-202-6
PubChem CID	14801
RTECS number	OP0350000
UNII	TF219GU161
CompTox Dashboard (EPA)	DTXSID501314019 DTXSID6042109, DTXSID501314019
- InChI: InChI=1S/Mn.2O Key: NUJOXMJBOLGQSY-UHFFFAOYSA-N
- SMILES: O=[Mn]=O

Properties
Chemical formula	MnO_{2}
Molar mass	86.9368 g/mol
Appearance	Brown-black solid
Density	5.026 g/cm^{3}
Melting point	535 °C (995 °F; 808 K) (decomposes)
Solubility in water	Insoluble
Magnetic susceptibility (χ)	+2280.0×10^{−6} cm^{3}/mol

Structure
Crystal structure	Tetragonal, tP6, No. 136
Space group	P4_{2}/mnm
Lattice constant	a = 0.44008 nm, b = 0.44008 nm, c = 0.28745 nm
Formula units (Z)	2

Thermochemistry
Heat capacity (C)	54.1 J·mol^{−1}·K^{−1}
Std molar entropy (S^{⦵}_{298})	53.1 J·mol^{−1}·K^{−1}
Std enthalpy of formation (Δ_{f}H^{⦵}_{298})	−520.0 kJ·mol^{−1}
Gibbs free energy (Δ_{f}G^{⦵})	−465.1 kJ·mol^{−1}

Hazards
- GHS labelling
Pictograms	(GHS07: Exclamation mark)
Signal word	Warning
Hazard statements	H302, H332
Precautionary statements	P261, P264, P270, P271, P301+P312, P304+P312, P304+P340, P312, P330, P501
NFPA 704 (fire diamond)	2 1 2 OX
Flash point	535 °C (995 °F; 808 K)
Safety data sheet (SDS)	ICSC 0175

Related compounds
Other anions	Manganese disulfide
Other cations	Technetium dioxide Rhenium dioxide
Related manganese oxides	Manganese(II) oxide Manganese(II,III) oxide Manganese(III) oxide Manganese heptoxide
- Except where otherwise noted, data are given for materials in their standard state (at 25 °C [77 °F], 100 kPa). verify (what is ?) Infobox references

Manganese dioxide is the inorganic compound with the formula MnO_{2}. This blackish or brown solid occurs naturally as the mineral pyrolusite, which is the main ore of manganese and a component of manganese nodules. The principal use for MnO_{2} is for dry-cell batteries, such as the alkaline battery and the zinc–carbon battery, although it is also used for other battery chemistries such as aqueous zinc-ion batteries. MnO_{2} is also used as a pigment and as a precursor to other manganese compounds, such as potassium permanganate (KMnO_{4}). It is used as a reagent in organic synthesis, for example, for the oxidation of allylic alcohols. MnO_{2} has an α-polymorph that can incorporate a variety of atoms (as well as water molecules) in the "tunnels" or "channels" between the manganese oxide octahedra. There is considerable interest in α-MnO_{2} as a possible cathode for lithium-ion batteries.

== Structure ==
Several polymorphs of MnO_{2} are claimed, as well as a hydrated form. Like many other dioxides, MnO_{2} crystallizes in the rutile crystal structure (this polymorph is called pyrolusite or β-MnO_{2}), with three-coordinate oxide anions and octahedral metal centres. MnO_{2} is characteristically nonstoichiometric, being deficient in oxygen. The complicated solid-state chemistry of this material is relevant to the lore of "freshly prepared" MnO_{2} in organic synthesis. The α-polymorph of MnO_{2} has a very open structure with "channels", which can accommodate metal ions such as silver or barium. α-MnO_{2} is often called hollandite, after a closely related mineral. Two other polymorphs, Todorokite and Romanechite MnO_{2}, have a similar structure to α-MnO_{2} but with larger channels. δ-MnO_{2} exhibits a layered structure more akin to that of graphite.

== Production ==
Naturally occurring manganese dioxide contains impurities and a considerable amount of manganese(III) oxide. Production of batteries and ferrite (two of the primary uses of manganese dioxide) requires high purity manganese dioxide. Batteries require "electrolytic manganese dioxide" while ferrites require "chemical manganese dioxide".

=== Chemical manganese dioxide ===
One method starts with natural manganese dioxide and converts it using dinitrogen tetroxide and water to a manganese(II) nitrate solution. Evaporation of the water leaves the crystalline nitrate salt. At temperatures of 400 °C, the salt decomposes, releasing N_{2}O_{4} and leaving a residue of purified manganese dioxide. These two steps can be summarized as:

MnO_{2} + N_{2}O_{4} ⇌ Mn(NO_{3})_{2}

In another process, manganese dioxide is carbothermically reduced to manganese(II) oxide which is dissolved in sulfuric acid. The filtered solution is treated with ammonium carbonate to precipitate MnCO_{3}. The carbonate is calcined in air to give a mixture of manganese(II) and manganese(IV) oxides. To complete the process, a suspension of this material in sulfuric acid is treated with sodium chlorate. Chloric acid, which forms in situ, converts any Mn(III) and Mn(II) oxides to the dioxide, releasing chlorine as a by-product.

Lastly, the action of potassium permanganate over manganese sulfate crystals produces the desired oxide.

2 KMnO_{4} + 3 MnSO_{4} + 2 H_{2}O→ 5 MnO_{2} + K_{2}SO_{4} + 2 H_{2}SO_{4}

The above reaction is an example of potassium permanganate reacting to make manganese dioxide.

Most reactions with potassium permanganate are known to make brown manganese dioxide as a byproduct, where potassium permanganate undergoes a Redox reaction where it reduces and oxidizes a compound with manganese dioxide byproduct.

=== Electrolytic manganese dioxide ===
Electrolytic manganese dioxide (EMD) is used in zinc–carbon batteries together with zinc chloride and ammonium chloride. EMD is commonly used in zinc manganese dioxide rechargeable alkaline (Zn RAM) cells also. For these applications, purity is extremely important. EMD is produced in a similar fashion as electrolytic tough pitch (ETP) copper: The manganese dioxide is dissolved in sulfuric acid (sometimes mixed with manganese sulfate) and subjected to a current between two electrodes. The MnO_{2} dissolves, enters solution as the sulfate, and is deposited on the anode.

== Reactions ==
The important reactions of MnO_{2} are associated with its redox, both oxidation and reduction.

=== Reduction ===
MnO_{2} is the principal precursor to ferromanganese and related alloys, which are widely used in the steel industry. The conversions involve carbothermal reduction using coke:

MnO_{2} + 2 C → Mn + 2 CO

The key redox reactions of MnO_{2} in batteries is the one-electron reduction:

MnO_{2} + e^{−} + H^{+} → MnO(OH)

MnO_{2} catalyses several reactions that form O_{2}. In a classical laboratory demonstration, heating a mixture of potassium chlorate and manganese dioxide produces oxygen gas. Manganese dioxide also catalyses the decomposition of hydrogen peroxide to oxygen and water:

2 H_{2}O_{2} → 2 H_{2}O + O_{2}

Manganese dioxide decomposes above about 530 °C to manganese(III) oxide and oxygen. At temperatures close to 1000 °C, the mixed-valence compound Mn_{3}O_{4} forms. Higher temperatures give MnO, which is reduced only with difficulty.

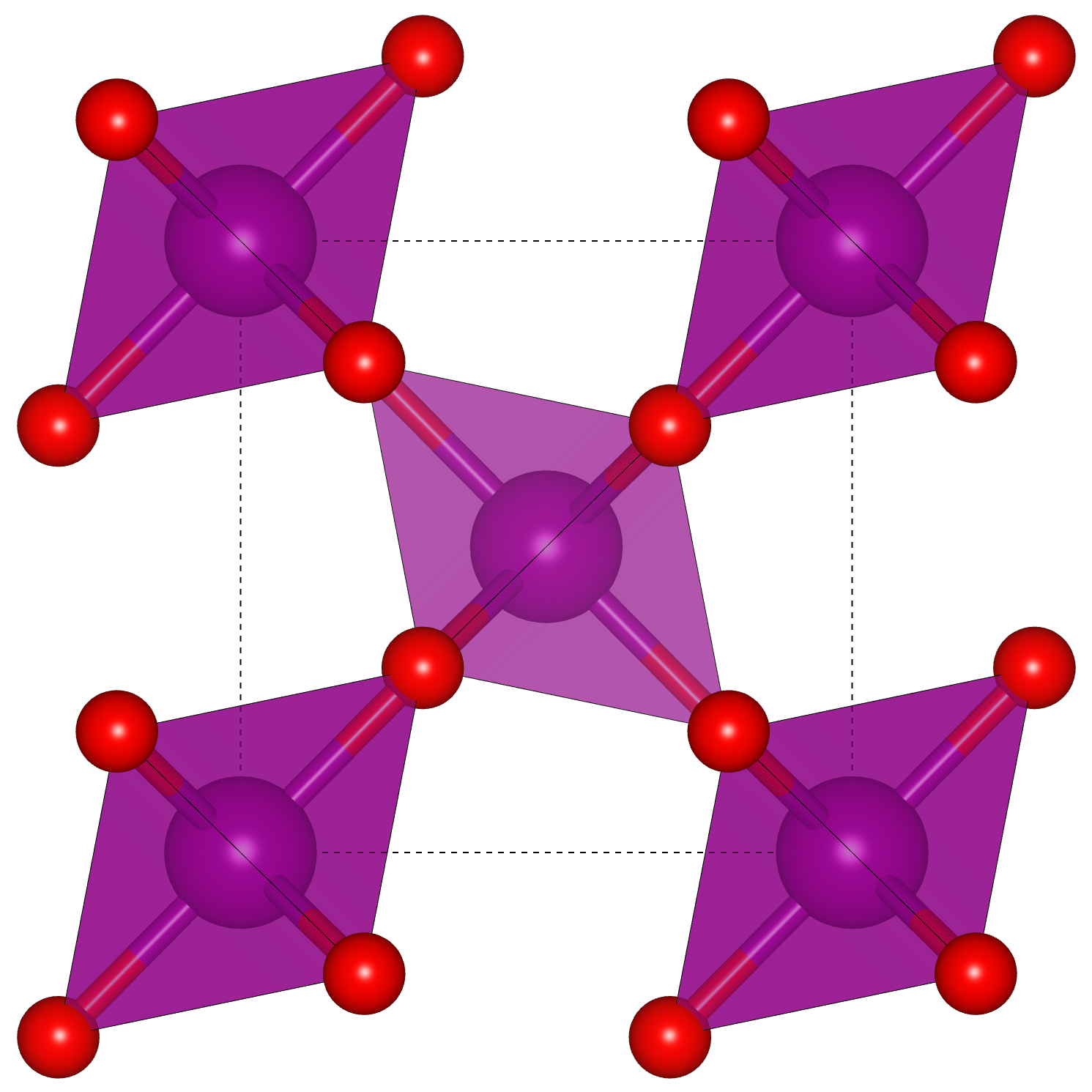
Crystal structure of $\ce{\beta-MnO2}$ (pyrolusite type). $\ce{MnO6}$ octahedra share corners forming 1D chains along [001].

Hot concentrated sulfuric acid reduces MnO_{2} to manganese(II) sulfate:

2 MnO_{2} + 2 H_{2}SO_{4} → 2 MnSO_{4} + O_{2} + 2 H_{2}O

The reaction of hydrogen chloride with MnO_{2} was used by Carl Wilhelm Scheele in the original isolation of chlorine gas in 1774. As a source of hydrogen chloride, Scheele treated sodium chloride with concentrated sulfuric acid:

MnO_{2} + 4 HCl → MnCl_{2} + Cl_{2} + 2 H_{2}O

Standard electrode potentials suggest that the reaction would not proceed...

E^{~~o~~} (MnO_{2}(s) + 4 H^{+} + 2 e^{−} ⇌ Mn^{2+} + 2 H_{2}O) = +1.23 V
E^{~~o~~} (Cl_{2}(g) + 2 e^{−} ⇌ 2 Cl^{−}) = +1.36 V

...but it is favoured by the extremely high acidity and the evolution (and removal) of gaseous chlorine.

This reaction is also a convenient way to remove the manganese dioxide precipitate from the ground glass joints after running a reaction (for example, an oxidation with potassium permanganate).

=== Oxidation ===
Heating a mixture of KOH and MnO_{2} in air gives green potassium manganate:

2 MnO_{2} + 4 KOH + O_{2} → 2 K_{2}MnO_{4} + 2 H_{2}O

Potassium manganate is the precursor to potassium permanganate, a common oxidant.

== Occurrence and applications ==
=== Prehistory ===
Excavations at the Pech-de-l'Azé cave site in southwestern France have yielded blocks of manganese dioxide writing tools, which date back 50,000 years and have been attributed to Neanderthals . Scientists have conjectured that Neanderthals used this mineral for body decoration, but there are many other readily available minerals that are more suitable for that purpose. Heyes et al. (in 2016) determined that the manganese dioxide lowers the combustion temperatures for wood from above 350°C (662°F) to 250°C (482°F), making fire making much easier and this is likely to be the purpose of the blocks.

=== Batteries ===
The predominant application of MnO_{2} is as a component of dry cell batteries: alkaline batteries and so called Leclanché cell, or zinc–carbon batteries. Approximately 500,000 tonnes are consumed for this application annually.

δ-MnO_{2} has also been researched as the primary cathode material for aqueous zinc-ion battery systems. Such cathodes often contain additives to address structural, kinetic, and conductivity-based issues. These carbon additives can include reduced graphene oxide (rGO) and carbon nanotubes, among others.

=== Organic synthesis ===
A specialized use of manganese dioxide is as oxidant in organic synthesis. The effectiveness of the reagent depends on the method of preparation, a problem that is typical for other heterogeneous reagents where surface area, among other variables, is a significant factor. The mineral pyrolusite makes a poor reagent. Usually, however, the reagent is generated in situ by treatment of an aqueous solution KMnO_{4} with a Mn(II) salt, typically the sulfate. MnO_{2} oxidizes allylic alcohols to the corresponding aldehydes or ketones:

cis-RCH=CHCH_{2}OH + MnO_{2} → cis-RCH=CHCHO + MnO + H_{2}O

The configuration of the double bond is conserved in the reaction. The corresponding acetylenic alcohols are also suitable substrates, although the resulting propargylic aldehydes can be quite reactive. Benzylic and even unactivated alcohols are also good substrates. 1,2-Diols are cleaved by MnO_{2} to dialdehydes or diketones. Otherwise, the applications of MnO_{2} are numerous, being applicable to many kinds of reactions including amine oxidation, aromatization, oxidative coupling, and thiol oxidation.

=== Other potential applications ===
In Geobacteraceae sp., MnO_{2} functions as an electron acceptor coupled to the oxidation of organic compounds. This theme has possible implications for bioremediation within the field of microbiology.

MnO_{2} is used as an inorganic pigment in ceramics and in glassmaking.

== See also ==
- List of inorganic pigments

== Cited sources ==
- Rumble, John R., ed. (2018). CRC Handbook of Chemistry and Physics (99th ed.). Boca Raton, Florida: CRC Press. ISBN 978-1-1385-6163-2.
