= Calcium:cation antiporter-2 =

The Ca^{2+}:H^{+} antiporter-2 (CaCA2) family (TC# 2.A.106) is a member of the lysine exporter (LysE) superfamily. Note that this family differs from the calcium:cation antiporter (CaCA) family which belongs to the cation diffusion facilitator (CDF) superfamily. CaCA2 family proteins are found in bacteria, archaea, yeast, plants and animals. This family, previously called the uncharacterized Protein Family 0016 (UPF0016), is well conserved throughout prokaryotes and eukaryotes. They are usually 200-350 amino acyl residues long and exhibit 5-7 transmembrane segments (TMSs).

== Members ==
The yeast golgi Gcr1-dependent translation factor 1 protein (Gdt1p; TC# 2.A.106.2.3) contributes to Ca^{2+} homeostasis. A yeast gdt1 mutant was found to be sensitive to high concentrations of Ca^{2+}. This sensitivity was suppressed by expression of human TMEM165 in yeast. Patch-clamp analyses on human cells indicated that TMEM165 catalyzes Ca^{2+} transport. Defects in TMEM165 affected both Ca^{2+} and pH homeostasis. Gdt1p and TMEM165 are probably Golgi-localized Ca^{2+}:H^{+} antiporters. Modification of the Golgi Ca^{2+} and pH balance could explain the glycosylation defects observed in TMEM165-deficient patients.

== Physiological significance ==
Defects in the human TMEM165 homologue (TC# 2.A.106.2.2) are the cause of congenital disorder of glycosylation type 2K (CDG2K), an autosomal recessive disorder with variable phenotypes. Affected individuals show psychomotor and growth retardation, and most have short stature. Other features include dysmorphism, hypotonia, eye abnormalities, acquired microcephaly, hepatomegaly, and skeletal dysplasia.

Congenital disorders of glycosylation are caused by a defect in glycoprotein biosynthesis and are characterized by under-glycosylated serum glycoproteins and a wide variety of clinical features. The broad spectrum of features may reflect the critical role of N-glycoproteins during embryonic development, differentiation, and maintenance of cell functions.

== General transport reaction ==
The generalized reaction catalyzed by CaCA2 family members is:

Ca^{2+} (cytoplasm) + H^{+} (golgi lumen) → Ca^{2+} (golgi lumen) + H^{+} (cytoplasm).
