= Propulsive gait =

Medical sign

Propulsive gait is a form of gait abnormality.

== Presentation ==
Stiff, with head and neck bent.

== Conditions associated with a propulsive gait ==
- Carbon monoxide poisoning
- Parkinson's disease
- Manganese poisoning
