= Manganese deficiency =

Manganese deficiency may refer to:

- Manganese deficiency (medicine)
- Manganese deficiency (plant)
