= Manganese(II) carbonate =

- Mn^{2+} [CO_{3}^{2−}]
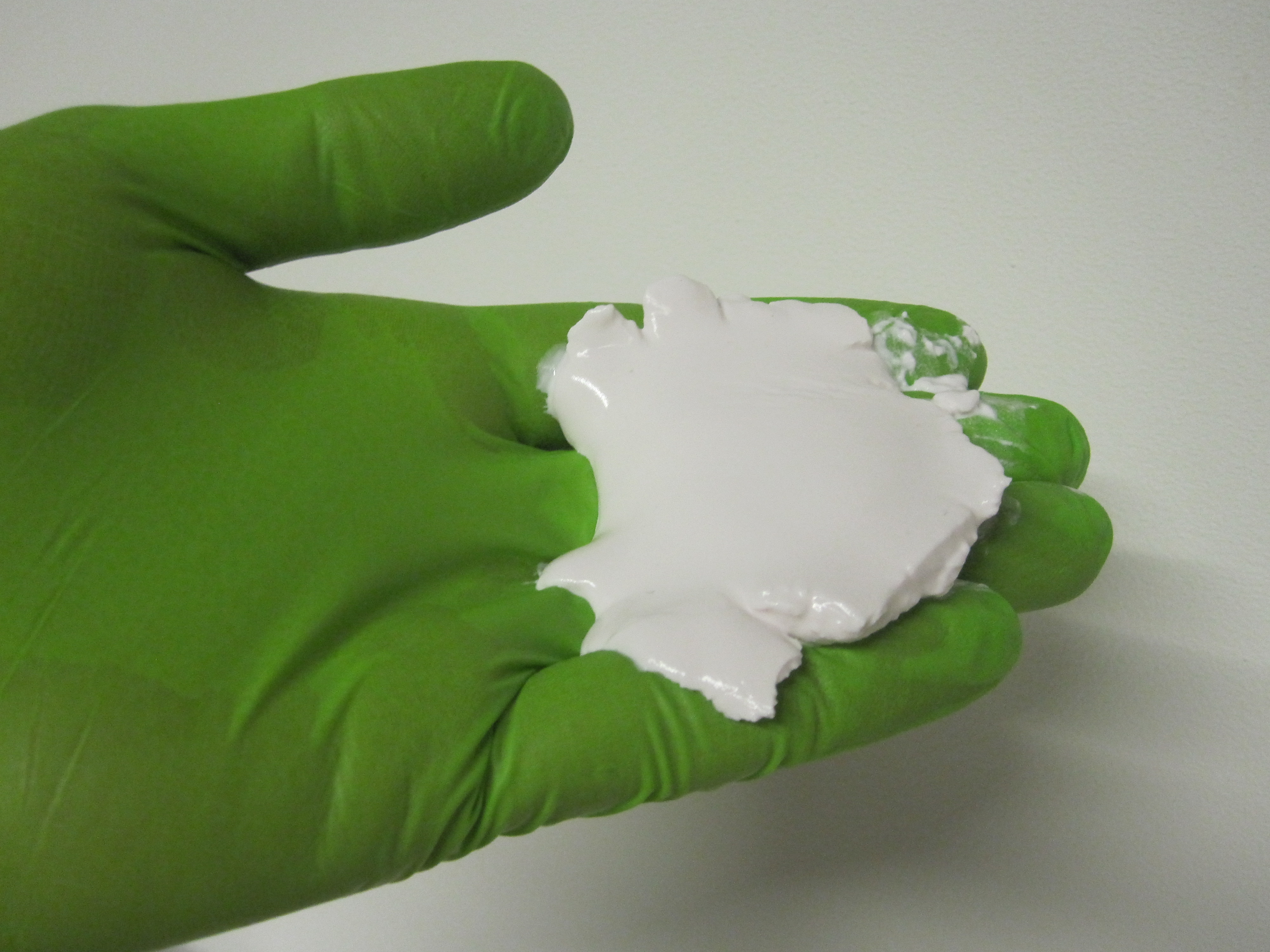

Names
- IUPAC name Manganese(II) carbonate

Identifiers
CAS Number	598-62-9
3D model (JSmol)	Interactive image
ChemSpider	11233
ECHA InfoCard	100.009.040
EC Number	209-942-9
PubChem CID	11726
UNII	9ZV57512ZM
CompTox Dashboard (EPA)	DTXSID1042108
- InChI: InChI=1S/CH2O3.Mn/c2-1(3)4;/h(H2,2,3,4);/q;+2/p-2 Key: XMWCXZJXESXBBY-UHFFFAOYSA-L; InChI=1/CH2O3.Mn/c2-1(3)4;/h(H2,2,3,4);/q;+2/p-2 Key: XMWCXZJXESXBBY-NUQVWONBAJ
- SMILES: [Mn+2].[O-]C([O-])=O

Properties
Chemical formula	MnCO_{3}
Molar mass	114.95 g mol^{−1}
Appearance	White to very faint pink solid
Density	3.12 g/cm^{3}
Melting point	200–300 °C (392–572 °F; 473–573 K) decomposes
Solubility in water	negligible
Solubility product (K_{sp})	2.24 × 10^{−11}
Solubility	soluble in dilute acid, CO_{2} insoluble in alcohol, ammonia
Magnetic susceptibility (χ)	+11,400·10^{−6} cm^{3}/mol
Refractive index (n_{D})	1.597 (20 °C, 589 nm)

Structure
Crystal structure	hexagonal-rhombohedral

Thermochemistry
Heat capacity (C)	94.8 J/mol·K
Std molar entropy (S^{⦵}_{298})	109.5 J/mol·K
Std enthalpy of formation (Δ_{f}H^{⦵}_{298})	−881.7 kJ/mol
Gibbs free energy (Δ_{f}G^{⦵})	−811.4 kJ/mol

Hazards
Flash point	Non-flammable
- Except where otherwise noted, data are given for materials in their standard state (at 25 °C [77 °F], 100 kPa). verify (what is ?) Infobox references

Manganese carbonate is a compound with the chemical formula MnCO_{3}. Manganese carbonate occurs naturally as the mineral rhodochrosite but it is typically produced industrially. It is a pale pink, water-insoluble salt. Approximately 20,000 metric tonnes were produced in 2005.

== Structure and production ==
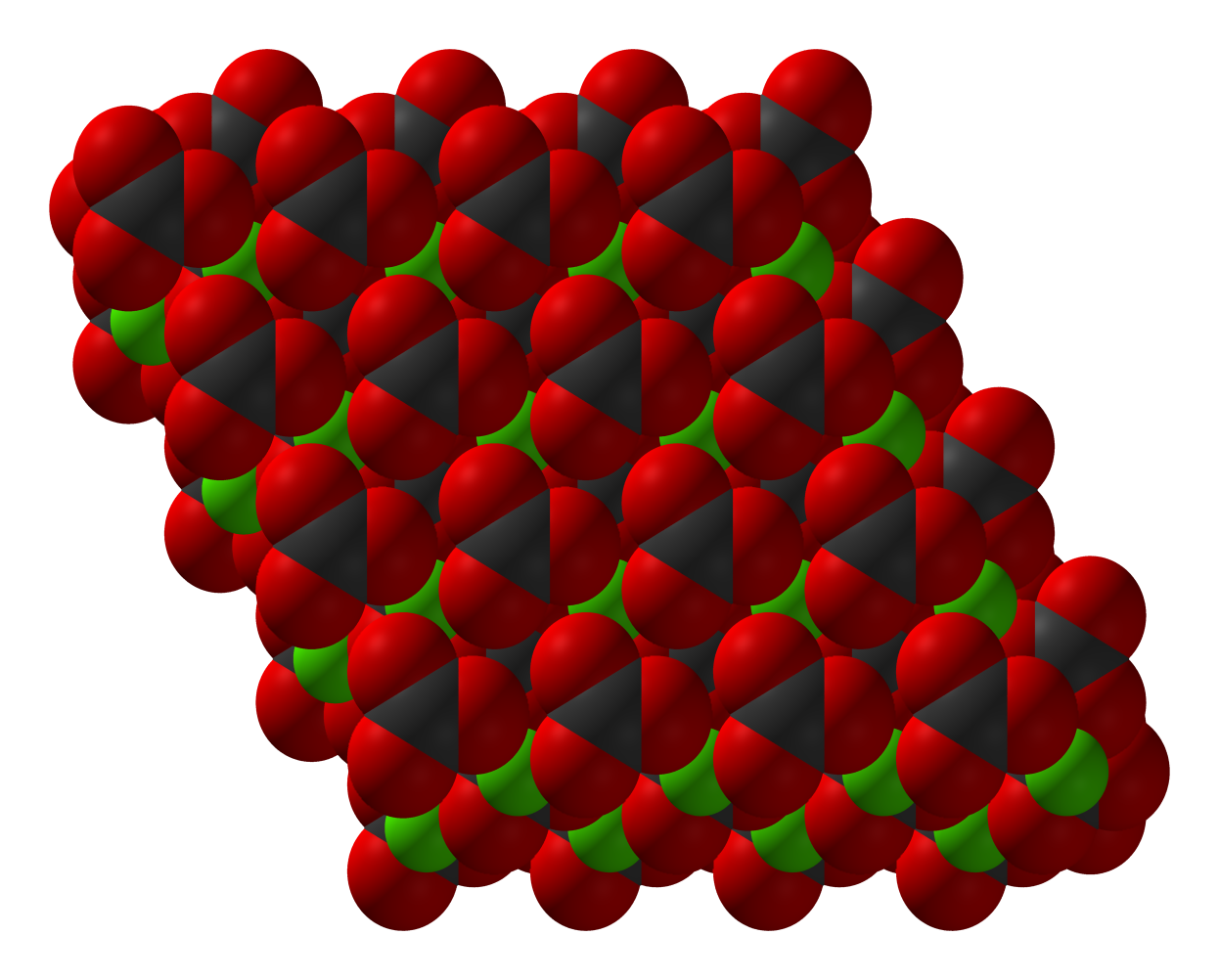
Manganese carbonate crystallizes in the same dense motif as calcium carbonate. Color code: red = O, green = Mn.

MnCO_{3} adopts a structure like calcite, consisting of manganese(II) ions in an octahedral coordination geometry.

Treatment of aqueous solutions of manganese(II) nitrate with ammonia and carbon dioxide leads to precipitation of this faintly pink solid. The side product, ammonium nitrate is used as fertilizer.

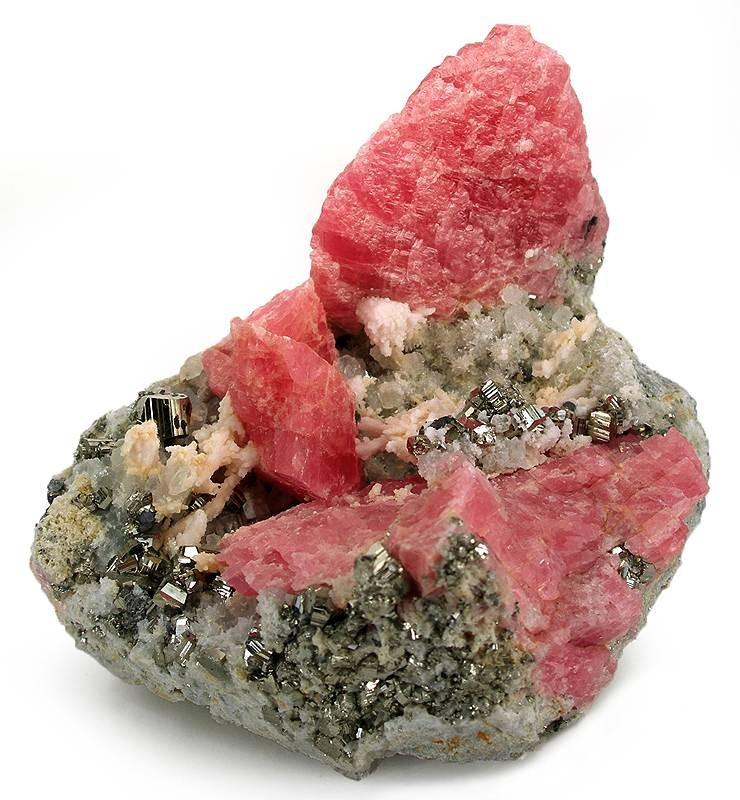
Pink rhodochrosite, the mineral form of MnCO_{3}, is of practical value as well as sought by collectors.

== Reactions and uses ==
The carbonate is insoluble in water but, like most carbonates, hydrolyses upon treatment with acids to give water-soluble salts.

Manganese carbonate decomposes with release of carbon dioxide, i.e. calcining, at 200 °C to give MnO_{1.88}:

MnCO_{3} + 0.44 O_{2} → MnO_{1.88} + CO_{2}

This method is sometimes employed in the production of manganese dioxide, which is used in dry-cell batteries and for ferrites.

Manganese carbonate is widely used as an additive within plant fertilizers. It is also used in multivitamins, in ceramics as a glaze colorant and flux, and in concrete stains.

== Toxicity ==
Manganese poisoning, also known as manganism, may be caused by long-term exposure to manganese dust or fumes.

== See also ==
- Manganese deficiency (medicine)
