= TERC =

TERC may refer to:

- Investigations in Numbers, Data, and Space, a mathematics curriculum
- Telomerase RNA component, a human gene
- Tellurium ion resistance, a protein family
- Tripura Electricity Regulatory Commission in India
