= Homoserine/threonine resistance transporter =

Homoserine lactone efflux protein

Identifiers
- Symbol: RhtB
- Pfam: PF01810
- InterPro: IPR004778.
- TCDB: 2.A.76
Available protein structures:
- PDB: IPR004778. PF01810 (ECOD; PDBsum)
- AlphaFold: IPR004778.; PF01810

The resistance to homoserine/threonine (RhtB) family (TC# 2.A.76) belongs to the lysine exporter (LysE) superfamily of transporters. Hundreds of sequenced proteins, derived from Gram-negative and Gram-positive bacteria as well as archaea, comprise the RhtB family, but few of these proteins are functionally characterized.

== Members ==
The first two members of the RhtB family to be characterized functionally were the RhtB (TC# 2.A.76.1.1) and RhtC (TC# 2.A.76.1.2) permeases of E. coli.

E. coli possesses five paralogues, and a large region of one of them (YahN of E. coli; TC# 2.A.76.1.3) exhibits significant sequence similarity to YggA of E. coli (TC# 2.A.75.1.2), an established member of the LysE family (TC #2.A.75).

The PSI-BLAST program groups the LysE family (TC# 2.A.75), the RhtB family and the CadD family (TC #2.A.77) together. These proteins are all of about the same size and apparent topology, further suggesting a common evolutionary origin.

The leucine exporter homologue (YeaS or LeuE; TC# 2.A.76.1.5) exports leucine and several other neutral, hydrophobic amino acids.

A representative list of proteins belonging to the RhtB family can be found in the Transporter Classification Database.

== General transport reaction ==
The transport reaction presumably catalyzed by members of the RhtB family is:

amino acid (in) + nH^{+} (out) ⇌ amino acid (out) + nH^{+} (in)
