= Manganese exporter =

Family of transport proteins

Putative Manganese Efflux Pump

Identifiers
- Symbol: MntP
- Pfam: PF02659
- InterPro: IPR003810
- TCDB: 2.A.107
Available protein structures:
- PDB: IPR003810 PF02659 (ECOD; PDBsum)
- AlphaFold: IPR003810; PF02659

The Manganese (Mn2+) Exporter (MntP) Family (TC# 2.A.107) is a member of the Lysine Exporter (LysE) Superfamily. The MntP family is a small family whose members have been found in bacteria and archaea. MntP proteins are of about 200 amino acyl residues with 6 putative transmembrane segments (TMSs). The Conserved Domain Database (CDD) recognized two DUF204 repeats, each repeat having 3 TMSs. A representative list of proteins belonging to the MntP family can be found in the Transporter Classification Database.

== Function ==
At least one member (YebN of E. coli, TC# 2.A.107.1.1) has been shown to function as a putative manganese efflux pump. Manganese sensitivity and intracellular manganese levels significantly increased in bacteria when the mntP (formerly yebN) gene, which encodes the MntP efflux pump, was deleted. While manganese is a highly important trace nutrient for organisms from bacteria to humans, acting as an important element in the defense against oxidative stress and as an enzyme cofactor, it becomes toxic when present in excess.

== See also ==
- Manganese
- Transporter Classification Database
