= Lysine exporter =

D- and L-lysine, histidine and arginine exporter (LysE)

Identifiers
- Symbol: LysE aka CGL1262
- Pfam: PF01810
- InterPro: IPR001123
- TCDB: 2.A.75
- OPM superfamily: 248
- OPM protein: 2n4x
Available protein structures:
- PDB: IPR001123 PF01810 (ECOD; PDBsum)
- AlphaFold: IPR001123; PF01810

Lysine Exporters are a superfamily of transmembrane proteins which export amino acids, lipids and heavy metal ions. They provide ionic homeostasis, play a role in cell envelope assembly, and protect from excessive concentrations of heavy metals in cytoplasm. The superfamily was named based on the early discovery of the LysE carrier protein of Corynebacterium glutamicum.

== Families ==
2.A.75 - The L-Lysine Exporter (LysE) Family

2.A.76 - The Resistance to Homoserine/Threonine (RhtB) Family

2.A.77 - The Cadmium Resistance (CadD) Family

2.A.95 - The 6TMS Neutral Amino Acid Transporter (NAAT) Family

2.A.106 - The Ca^{2+}:H^{+} Antiporter-2 (CaCA2) Family

2.A.107 - The Mn^{2+} exporter (MntP) Family

2.A.108 - The Iron/Lead Transporter (ILT) Family

2.A.109 - The Tellurium Ion Resistance (TerC) Family

2.A.113 - The Nickel/Cobalt Transporter (NicO) Family

2.A.116 - The Peptidoglycolipid Addressing Protein (GAP) Family

5.A.1 - The Disulfide Bond Oxidoreductase D (DsbD) Family

== The LysE family ==
Two members of the LysE family (LysE of Corynebacterium glutamicum (TC# 2.A.75.1.1) and ArgO of E. coli) have been functionally characterized, but functionally uncharacterized homologues are encoded within the genomes of many bacteria including Bacillus subtilis, Mycobacterium tuberculosis, Aeromonas salmonicida, Helicobacter pylori, Vibrio cholerae and Yersinia pestis. Thus, LysE family members are found widely distributed in Gram-negative and Gram-positive bacteria.

=== Structure ===
These proteins are 190-240 amino acyl residues in length and possess six hydrophobic regions. PhoA fusion analyses of LysE of C. glutamicum provided evidence for a 5 transmembrane α-helical spanner (TMS) typology with the N-terminus inside and the C-terminus outside. However, some evidence suggests a 6 TMS topology.

=== Function ===
LysE appears to catalyze unidirectional efflux of L-lysine (and other basic amino acids such as L-arginine), and it provides the sole route for L-lysine excretion. The energy source is believed to be the proton motive force (H^{+} antiport). The E. coli ArgO homologue (TC# 2.A.75.1.2) effluxes arginine and possibly lysine and canavanine as well.

Early studies showed that the LysE family is related to the RhtB family (TC #2.A.76) as well as the CadD family (TC #2.A.77) based both on the similar sizes and topologies of their members and on PSI-BLAST results.

==== Generalized Transport Reaction ====
The generalized transport reaction for LysE is:

Lysine (in) ^{+} [nH^{+} (out) or nOH^{−} (in)] Lysine (out) ^{+} [nH^{+} (in) or nOH^{−} (out)].
