= Manganese =

Manganese, _{25}Mn
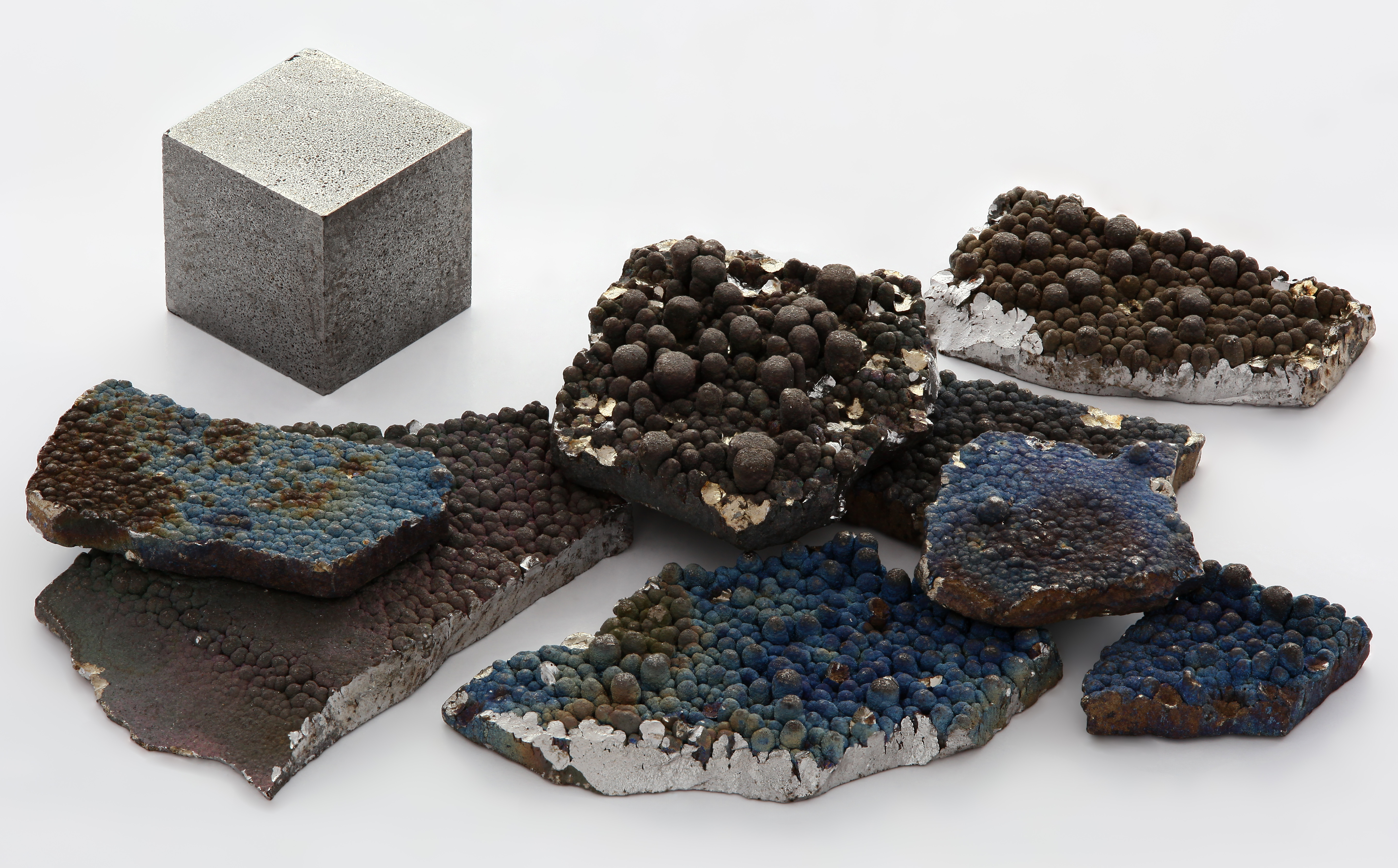
- Pure manganese cube and oxidized manganese chips

Manganese
- Pronunciation: /mæŋɡəˈniːz/ (mang-gə-NEEZ); /ˈmæŋɡəniːz/ (MANG-gə-neez)
- Appearance: silvery metallic

Standard atomic weight A_{r}°(Mn)
- 54.938043±0.000002; 54.938±0.001 (abridged)

Manganese in the periodic table
Hydrogen																															Helium
Lithium	Beryllium																									Boron	Carbon	Nitrogen	Oxygen	Fluorine	Neon
Sodium	Magnesium																									Aluminium	Silicon	Phosphorus	Sulfur	Chlorine	Argon
Potassium	Calcium															Scandium	Titanium	Vanadium	Chromium	Manganese	Iron	Cobalt	Nickel	Copper	Zinc	Gallium	Germanium	Arsenic	Selenium	Bromine	Krypton
Rubidium	Strontium															Yttrium	Zirconium	Niobium	Molybdenum	Technetium	Ruthenium	Rhodium	Palladium	Silver	Cadmium	Indium	Tin	Antimony	Tellurium	Iodine	Xenon
Caesium	Barium	Lanthanum	Cerium	Praseodymium	Neodymium	Promethium	Samarium	Europium	Gadolinium	Terbium	Dysprosium	Holmium	Erbium	Thulium	Ytterbium	Lutetium	Hafnium	Tantalum	Tungsten	Rhenium	Osmium	Iridium	Platinum	Gold	Mercury (element)	Thallium	Lead	Bismuth	Polonium	Astatine	Radon
Francium	Radium	Actinium	Thorium	Protactinium	Uranium	Neptunium	Plutonium	Americium	Curium	Berkelium	Californium	Einsteinium	Fermium	Mendelevium	Nobelium	Lawrencium	Rutherfordium	Dubnium	Seaborgium	Bohrium	Hassium	Meitnerium	Darmstadtium	Roentgenium	Copernicium	Nihonium	Flerovium	Moscovium	Livermorium	Tennessine	Oganesson
–
↑
Mn
↓
Tc
chromium ← manganese → iron
- Atomic number (Z): 25
- Group: group 7
- Period: period 4
- Block: d-block
- Electron configuration: [Ar] 3d^{5} 4s^{2}
- Electrons per shell: 2, 8, 13, 2

Physical properties
- Phase at STP: solid
- Melting point: 1519 K (1246 °C, 2275 °F)
- Boiling point: 2334 K (2061 °C, 3742 °F)
- Density (at 20° C): 7.476 g/cm^{3}
- when liquid (at m.p.): 5.95 g/cm^{3}
- Heat of fusion: 12.91 kJ/mol
- Heat of vaporization: 221 kJ/mol
- Molar heat capacity: 26.32 J/(mol·K)
- Specific heat capacity: 479.086 J/(kg·K)
Vapor pressure
P (Pa)	1	10	100	1 k	10 k	100 k
at T (K)	1228	1347	1493	1691	1955	2333

Atomic properties
- Oxidation states: common: +2, +4, +7 −3, −2, −1, 0, +1, +3, +5, +6
- Electronegativity: Pauling scale: 1.55
- Ionization energies: 1st: 717.3 kJ/mol; 2nd: 1509.0 kJ/mol; 3rd: 3248 kJ/mol; (more)
- Atomic radius: empirical: 127 pm
- Covalent radius: Low spin: 139±5 pm High spin: 161±8 pm
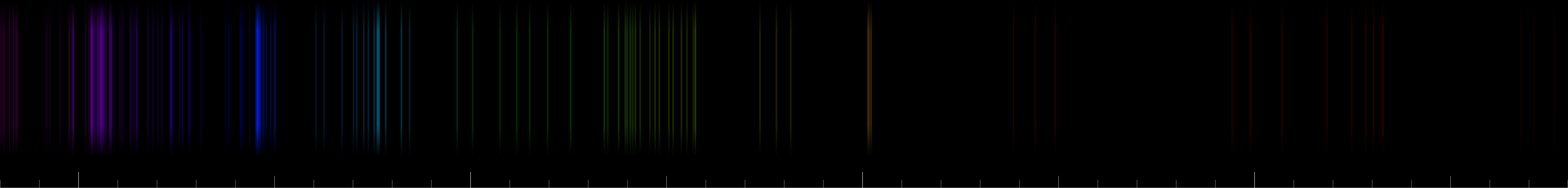
- Spectral lines of manganese

Other properties
- Natural occurrence: primordial
- Crystal structure: α-Mn: body-centered cubic (bcc) (cI58)
- Lattice constant: a = 891.16 pm (at 20 °C)
- Thermal expansion: 23.61×10^{−6}/K (at 20 °C)
- Thermal conductivity: 7.81 W/(m⋅K)
- Electrical resistivity: 1.44 µΩ⋅m (at 20 °C)
- Magnetic ordering: paramagnetic
- Molar magnetic susceptibility: (α) +529.0×10^{−6} cm^{3}/mol (293 K)
- Young's modulus: 198 GPa
- Bulk modulus: 120 GPa
- Speed of sound thin rod: 5150 m/s (at 20 °C)
- Mohs hardness: 6.0
- Brinell hardness: 196 MPa
- CAS Number: 7439-96-5

History
- Naming: after Magnesia, Greece
- Discovery: Carl Wilhelm Scheele (1774)
- First isolation: Johann Gottlieb Gahn (1774)

Isotopes of manganese
Main isotopes			Decay	
Isotope	abundance	half-life (t_{1/2})	mode	product
^{52}Mn	synth	5.591 d	β^{+}	^{52}Cr
^{53}Mn	trace	3.7×10^{6} y	ε	^{53}Cr
^{54}Mn	synth	312.08 d	ε	^{54}Cr
^{54}Mn	synth	312.08 d	β^{−}	^{54}Fe
^{54}Mn	synth	312.08 d	β^{+}	^{54}Cr
^{55}Mn	100%	stable		

Manganese is a chemical element; it has the symbol Mn and atomic number 25. It is a hard, brittle, silvery metal, often found in minerals in combination with iron. First isolated in the 1770s, manganese is a transition metal with many industrial alloy uses, particularly in stainless steels in which it improves strength, workability, and resistance to wear. Various manganese oxides are used as oxidising agents, as rubber additives, and in glass making, fertilizers, and ceramics. Manganese sulfate can be used as a fungicide.

Manganese is also an essential human dietary element, important in macronutrient metabolism, bone formation, and free radical defense systems. It is a critical component in dozens of proteins and enzymes. It is found mostly in the bones, but also the liver, kidneys, and brain. In the human brain, manganese is bound to manganese metalloproteins, most notably glutamine synthetase in astrocytes.

Manganese in the form of the deep violet salt potassium permanganate is commonly used in laboratories as an oxidizer. Potassium permanganate is also used as a biocide in water treatment.

It occurs at the active sites in some enzymes. Of particular interest is the use of a Mn–O cluster, the oxygen-evolving complex, in the production of oxygen by plants.

== Characteristics ==
=== Physical properties ===
Manganese is a silvery-gray metal that resembles iron. It is hard and very brittle, difficult to melt, but oxidizes easily. Manganese and its common ions are paramagnetic. Manganese tarnishes slowly in air and oxidizes ("rusts") like iron in water containing dissolved oxygen.

=== Isotopes ===
Naturally occurring manganese is composed of one stable isotope, ^{55}Mn. Several radioisotopes have been isolated and described, ranging from ^{46}Mn to ^{72}Mn; the most stable ones are ^{53} with a half-life of 3.7 million years, ^{54}Mn with a half-life of 312.08 days, and ^{52}Mn with a half-life of 5.591 days. All of the remaining radioactive isotopes have half-lives of less than three hours, and the majority of less than one minute. The primary decay mode in isotopes lighter than the most abundant stable isotope, ^{55}Mn, is electron capture, and the primary mode in heavier isotopes is beta decay. Manganese also has three meta states.

Manganese is part of the iron group of elements, which are thought to be synthesized in massive stars shortly before the supernova explosion. ^{53}Mn decays to ^{53}Cr with a half-life of 3.7 million years. Because of its short half-life, ^{53}Mn is relatively rare; it is produced by the impact of cosmic rays on iron.

Chromium and manganese are found together sufficiently for measurement of both to find application in isotope geology, and the Mn/Cr ratios here for dating the early Solar System. Mn–Cr isotopic ratios reinforce the evidence from ^{26}Al and ^{107}Pd for the early history of the Solar System. Variations in ^{53}Cr/^{52}Cr and Mn/Cr ratios from several meteorites suggest a non-zero initial ^{53}Mn/^{55}Mn ratio, which indicate that Cr isotopic composition variations must result from in situ decay of ^{53}Mn in differentiated planetary bodies. Hence, ^{53}Mn provides additional evidence for nucleosynthetic processes immediately before the coalescence of the Solar System.

=== Allotropes ===
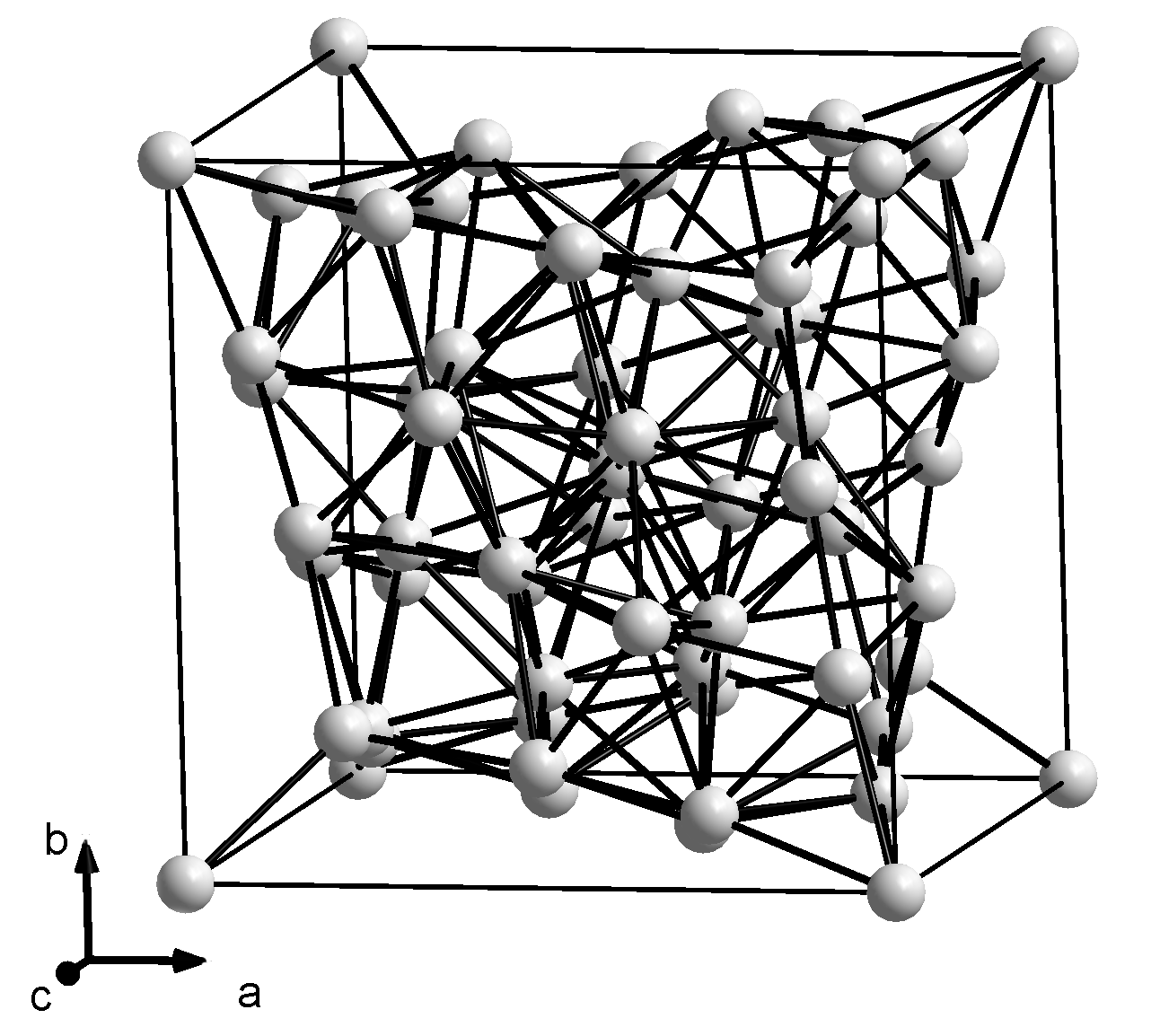
Unit cell of an α-Mn crystal

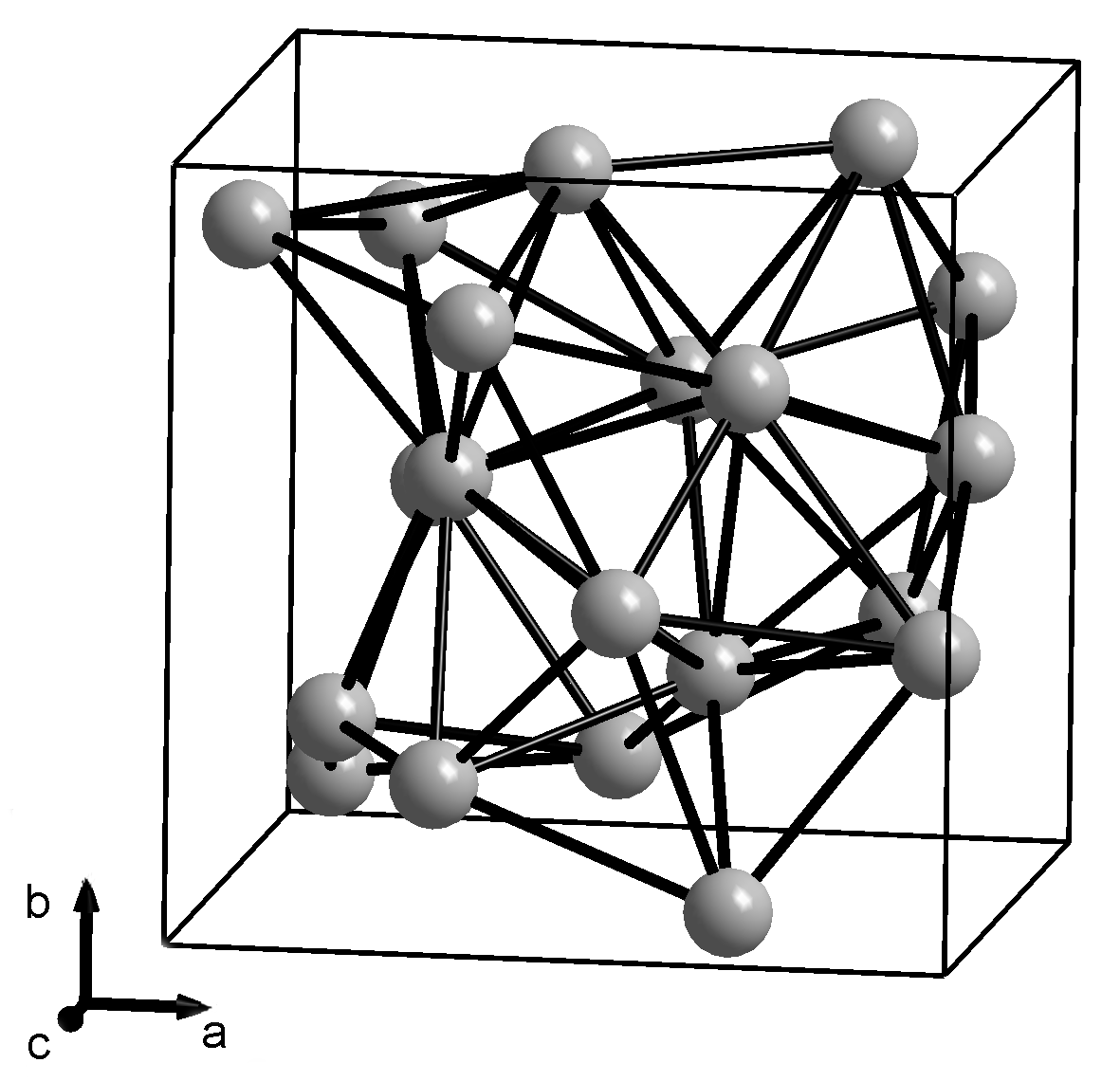
Unit cell of a β-Mn crystal

Four allotropes (structural forms) of solid manganese are known, labeled α, β, γ and δ, and occur at successively higher temperatures. All are metallic, stable at standard pressure, and have a cubic crystal lattice, but they vary widely in their atomic structures.

Alpha manganese (α-Mn) is the equilibrium phase at room temperature. It has a body-centered cubic lattice and is unusual among elemental metals in that it has a very complex unit cell, with 58 atoms per cell (29 atoms per primitive unit cell) with manganese atoms in four different types of surroundings (sites). It is paramagnetic at room temperature and antiferromagnetic at temperatures below 95 K (−178 °C).

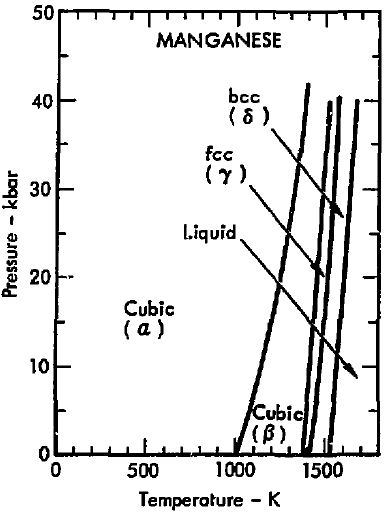
Phase diagram of manganese

Beta manganese (β-Mn) forms when heated above the transition temperature of 973 K (700 °C; 1,290 °F). It has a primitive cubic structure with 20 atoms per unit cell at two types of sites, which is as complex as that of any other elemental metal. It is easily obtained as a metastable phase at room temperature by rapid quenching of manganese at 850 °C (1,120 K; 1,560 °F) in ice water. It does not show magnetic ordering, remaining paramagnetic down to the lowest temperature measured (1.1 K).

Gamma manganese (γ-Mn) forms when heated above 1,370 K (1,100 °C; 2,010 °F). It has a simple face-centered cubic structure (four atoms per unit cell). When quenched to room temperature it converts to β-Mn, but it can be stabilized at room temperature by alloying it with at least 5 percent of other elements (such as C, Fe, Ni, Cu, Pd or Au). These solute-stabilized alloys distort into a face-centered tetragonal structure.

Delta manganese (δ-Mn) forms when heated above 1,406 K (1,130 °C; 2,070 °F) and is stable up to the manganese melting point of 1,519 K (1,250 °C; 2,270 °F). It has a body-centered cubic structure (two atoms per cubic unit cell).

== Chemical compounds ==
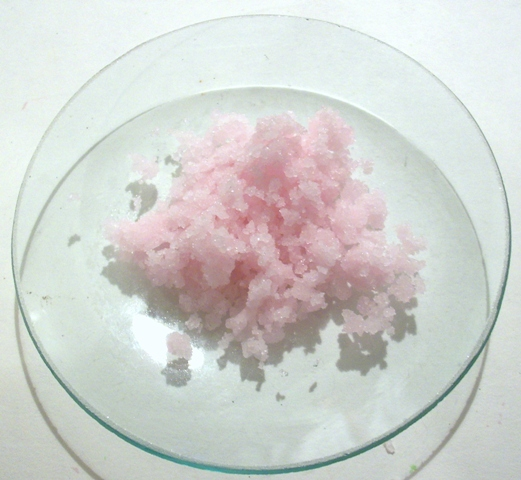
Manganese(II) chloride crystals – the pale pink color of Mn(II) salts is due to a spin-forbidden 3d transition.

Common oxidation states of manganese are +2, +4, and +7, although all oxidation states from −3 to +7 have been observed. Manganese in oxidation state +7 is represented by salts of the intensely purple permanganate anion MnO_{4}^{−}. Potassium permanganate is a commonly used laboratory reagent because of its oxidizing properties; it is used as a topical medicine (for example, in the treatment of fish diseases). Solutions of potassium permanganate were among the first stains and fixatives to be used in the preparation of biological cells and tissues for electron microscopy.

Aside from various permanganate salts, Mn(VII) is represented by the unstable, volatile derivative Mn_{2}O_{7}. Oxyhalides (MnO_{3}F and MnO_{3}Cl) are powerful oxidizing agents. The most prominent example of Mn in the +6 oxidation state is the green anion manganate, MnO_{4}^{2−}. Manganate salts are intermediates in the extraction of manganese from its ores. Compounds with oxidation states +5 are somewhat elusive, and often found associated to an oxide (O^{2−}) or nitride (N^{3−}) ligand. One example is the blue anion hypomanganate MnO_{4}^{3−}.

Mn(IV) is somewhat enigmatic because it is common in nature but far rarer in synthetic chemistry. The most common Mn ore, pyrolusite, is MnO_{2}. It is the dark brown pigment of many cave drawings and is also a common ingredient in dry cell batteries. Complexes of Mn(IV), such as in K_{2}MnF_{6}, are known but are rarer than those of manganese in the lower oxidation states. Mn(IV)-OH complexes are an intermediate in some enzymes, including the oxygen-evolving center (OEC) in plants.

Simple derivatives of Mn^{3+} are rarely encountered but can be stabilized by suitably alkaline ligands. Manganese(III) acetate is an oxidant useful in organic synthesis. Solid compounds of manganese(III) are characterized by a strong purple-red color and a preference for distorted octahedral coordination resulting from the Jahn-Teller effect.

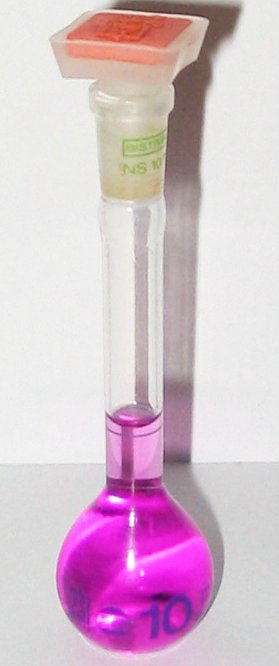
Aqueous solution of KMnO_{4} illustrating the deep purple of Mn(VII) as it occurs in permanganate

A particularly common oxidation state for manganese in aqueous solution is +2, which has a pale pink color. Many manganese(II) compounds are known, such as the aquo complexes derived from manganese(II) sulfate (MnSO_{4}) and manganese(II) chloride (MnCl_{2}). This oxidation state is also seen in the mineral rhodochrosite (manganese(II) carbonate). Manganese(II) commonly exists with a high-spin ground state, with 5 unpaired electrons, because of its high pairing energy. There are no spin-allowed d–d transitions in manganese(II), which explain its faint color.

Oxidation states of manganese
−3	Mn(CO)(NO)_{3}
−2	[Mn(_{1},^{−}_{5}COD)_{2}]^{2−}
−1	HMn(CO)_{5}
0	Mn_{2}(CO)_{10}
+1	MnC_{5}H_{4}CH_{3}(CO)_{3}
**+2**	MnCl_{2}, MnCO_{3}, MnO
+3	MnF_{3}, Mn(OAc)_{3}, Mn_{2}O_{3}
**+4**	MnO_{2}
+5	K_{3}MnO_{4}
+6	K_{2}MnO_{4}
**+7**	KMnO_{4}, Mn_{2}O_{7}
Common oxidation states are in bold.

=== Organomanganese compounds ===
Manganese forms a large variety of organometallic derivatives, i.e., compounds with Mn-C bonds. The organometallic derivatives include numerous examples of Mn in its lower oxidation states, i.e. Mn(−III) up through Mn(I). This area of organometallic chemistry is attractive because Mn is inexpensive and of relatively low toxicity.

Of greatest commercial interest is methylcyclopentadienyl manganese tricarbonyl (MMT), which is used as an anti-knock compound added to gasoline in some countries, featuring Mn(I). Consistent with other aspects of Mn(II) chemistry, manganocene (Mn(C_{5}H_{5})_{2}) is high-spin. In contrast, its neighboring metal, iron, forms an air-stable, low-spin derivative in the form of ferrocene (Fe(C_{5}H_{5})_{2}). When conducted under an atmosphere of carbon monoxide, reduction of Mn(II) salts gives dimanganese decacarbonyl Mn_{2}(CO)_{10}, an orange and volatile solid. The air-stability of this Mn(0) compound (and its many derivatives) reflects the powerful electron-acceptor properties of carbon monoxide. Many alkene complexes and alkyne complexes are derived from Mn_{2}(CO)_{10}.

In Mn(CH_{3})_{2}(dmpe)_{2} (dmpe = (CH_{3})_{2}PCH_{2}CH_{2}P(CH_{3})_{2}), Mn(II) is low spin, which contrasts with the high spin character of its precursor, MnBr_{2}(dmpe)_{2} . Polyalkyl and polyaryl derivatives of manganese often exist in higher oxidation states, reflecting the electron-releasing properties of alkyl and aryl ligands. One example is [Mn(CH_{3})_{6}]^{2−}.

== History ==
The origin of the name manganese is complex. In ancient times, two black minerals were identified from the regions of the Magnetes (either Magnesia, located within modern Greece, or Magnesia ad Sipylum, located within modern Turkey). They were both called magnes from their place of origin, but were considered to differ in sex. The male magnes attracted iron, and was the iron ore now known as lodestone or magnetite, and which probably gave us the term magnet. The female magnes ore did not attract iron, but was used to decolorize glass. This female magnes was later called magnesia, known now in modern times as pyrolusite or manganese dioxide. Neither this mineral nor elemental manganese is magnetic. In the 16th century, manganese dioxide was called manganesum (note the two Ns instead of one) by glassmakers, possibly as a corruption and concatenation of two words, since alchemists and glassmakers eventually had to differentiate a magnesia nigra (the black ore) from magnesia alba (a white ore, also from Magnesia, also useful in glassmaking). Italian physician Michele Mercati called magnesia nigra manganesa, and finally the metal isolated from it became known as manganese (German: Mangan). The name magnesia was eventually used to refer only to the white magnesia alba (magnesium oxide), which provided the name magnesium for the free element when it was isolated much later.

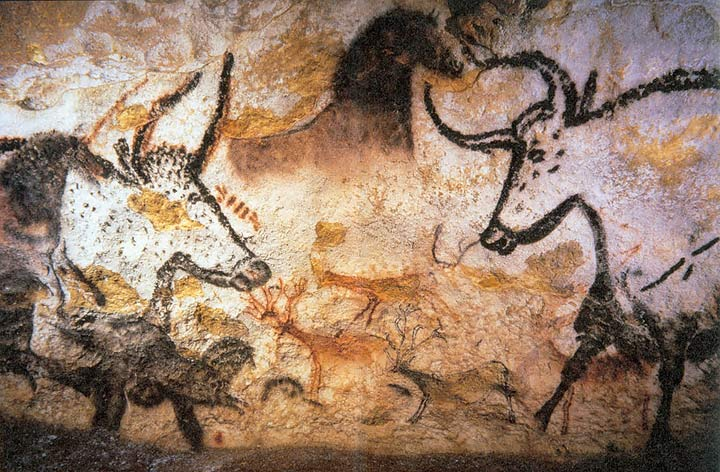
Some of the cave paintings in Lascaux, France, use manganese-based pigments.

Manganese dioxide, which is abundant in nature, has long been used as a pigment. The cave paintings in Gargas that are 30,000 to 24,000 years old are made from the mineral form of MnO_{2} pigments.

Manganese compounds were used by Egyptian and Roman glassmakers, either to add to, or remove, color from glass. Use as "glassmakers soap" continued through the Middle Ages until modern times and is evident in 14th-century glass from Venice.

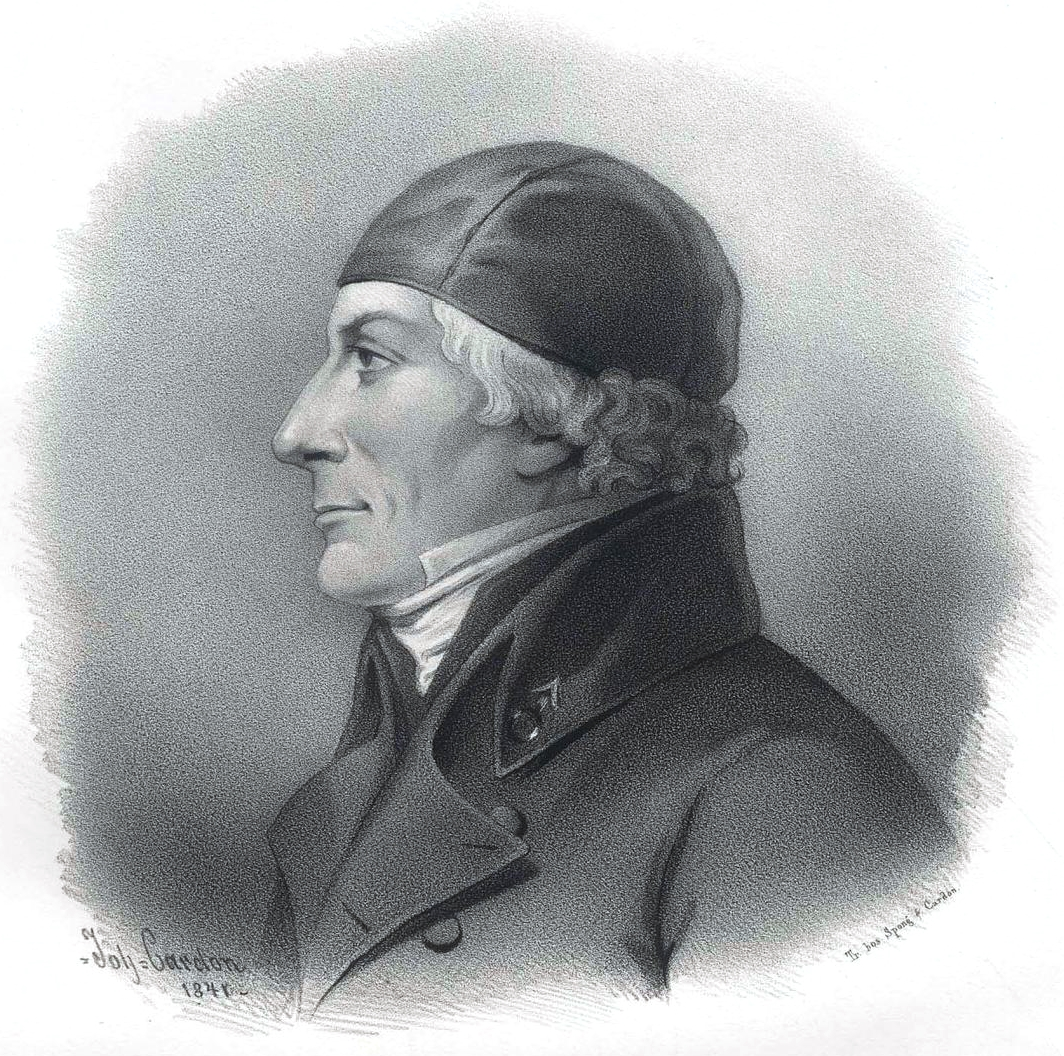
Credit for first isolating manganese is usually given to Johan Gottlieb Gahn.

Because it was used in glassmaking, manganese dioxide was available for experiments by alchemists, the first chemists. Ignatius Gottfried Kaim (1770) and Johann Glauber (17th century) discovered that manganese dioxide could be converted to permanganate, a useful laboratory reagent. By the mid-18th century, the Swedish chemist Carl Wilhelm Scheele used manganese dioxide to produce chlorine. First, hydrochloric acid, or a mixture of dilute sulfuric acid and sodium chloride was made to react with manganese dioxide, and later hydrochloric acid from the Leblanc process was used and the manganese dioxide was recycled by the Weldon process.

Scheele and others were aware that pyrolusite (mineral form of manganese dioxide) contained a new element. Johan Gottlieb Gahn isolated an impure sample of manganese metal in 1774, which he did by reducing the dioxide with carbon. Ignatius Gottfried Kaim also may have reduced manganese dioxide to isolate the metal, but that is uncertain.

The manganese content of some iron ores used in Greece led to speculations that steel produced from that ore contains additional manganese, making the Spartan steel exceptionally hard. Around the beginning of the 19th century, manganese was used in steelmaking and several patents were granted. In 1816, it was documented that iron alloyed with manganese was harder but not more brittle. In 1837, British academic James Couper noted an association between miners' heavy exposure to manganese and a form of Parkinson's disease. In 1912, United States patents were granted for protecting firearms against rust and corrosion with manganese phosphate electrochemical conversion coatings, and the process has seen widespread use ever since.

The invention of the Leclanché cell in 1866 and the subsequent improvement of batteries containing manganese dioxide as cathodic depolarizer increased the demand for manganese dioxide. Until the development of batteries with nickel–cadmium and lithium, most batteries contained manganese. The zinc–carbon battery and the alkaline battery normally use industrially produced manganese dioxide because naturally occurring manganese dioxide contains impurities. In the 20th century, manganese dioxide was widely used as the cathode for commercial disposable dry batteries of both the standard (zinc–carbon) and alkaline types.

Manganese is essential to iron and steel production by virtue of its sulfur-fixing, deoxidizing, and alloying properties. This application was first recognized by the British metallurgist Robert Forester Mushet (1811–1891), who introduced the element to the steel manufacture process in 1856 in the form of spiegeleisen.

== Occurrence ==
Manganese comprises about 1000 ppm (0.1%) of the Earth's crust and is the 12th most abundant element. Soil contains 7–9000 ppm of manganese with an average of 440 ppm. The atmosphere contains 0.01 μg/m^{3}. Manganese occurs principally as pyrolusite (MnO_{2}), braunite ((Mn^{2+},Mn^{3+})_{6}SiO_{12}), psilomelane (Ba,H_{2}O)_{2}Mn_{5}O_{10}, and to a lesser extent as rhodochrosite (MnCO_{3}).

Manganese ore	Psilomelane (manganese ore)	Spiegeleisen is an iron alloy with a manganese content of approximately 15%.	Manganese oxide dendrites on limestone from Solnhofen, Germany – a kind of pseudofossil. Scale is in mm	Mineral rhodochrosite (manganese(II) carbonate)

Percentage of manganese output in 2006 by countries

The most important manganese ore is pyrolusite (MnO_{2}). Other economically important manganese ores usually show a close spatial relation to the iron ores, such as sphalerite. Land-based resources are large but irregularly distributed. About 80% of the known world manganese resources are in South Africa; other important manganese deposits are in Ukraine, Australia, India, China, Gabon and Brazil.

Manganese is mainly mined in South Africa, Australia, China, Gabon, Brazil, India, Kazakhstan, Ghana, Ukraine and Malaysia. In South Africa, most identified deposits are located near Hotazel in the Northern Cape Province, (Kalahari manganese fields), with a 2011 estimate of 15 billion tons. In 2011 South Africa produced 3.4 million tons, topping all other nations.

=== Oceanic environment ===
An abundant resource of manganese is in the form of manganese nodules found on the ocean floor. These nodules, which are composed of 29% manganese, are located along the ocean floor. The environmental impacts of nodule collection are of interest. According to 1978 estimate, the ocean floor has 500 billion tons of manganese nodules. As of April 2025, attempts to find economically viable methods of harvesting manganese nodules are still ongoing, however, none has been commercialized.

In 1972, the CIA's Project Azorian, through billionaire Howard Hughes, commissioned the ship Hughes Glomar Explorer with the cover story of harvesting manganese nodules from the sea floor. This cover story triggered a rush of activity to collect manganese nodules. The real mission of Hughes Glomar Explorer was to raise a sunken Soviet submarine, the K-129, with the goal of retrieving Soviet code books.

Manganese also occurs in the oceanic environment, as dissolved manganese (dMn), which is found throughout the world's oceans, 90% of which originates from hydrothermal vents. Particulate Mn develops in buoyant plumes over an active vent source, while the dMn behaves conservatively. Mn concentrations vary between the water columns of the ocean. At the surface, dMn is elevated due to input from external sources such as rivers, dust, and shelf sediments. Coastal sediments normally have lower Mn concentrations, but can increase due to anthropogenic discharges from industries such as mining and steel manufacturing, which enter the ocean from river inputs. Surface dMn concentrations can also be elevated biologically through photosynthesis and physically from coastal upwelling and wind-driven surface currents. Internal cycling such as photo-reduction from UV radiation can also elevate levels by speeding up the dissolution of Mn-oxides and oxidative scavenging, preventing Mn from sinking to deeper waters. Elevated levels at mid-depths can occur near mid-ocean ridges and hydrothermal vents. The hydrothermal vents release dMn enriched fluid into the water. The dMn can then travel up to 4,000 km due to the microbial capsules present, preventing exchange with particles, lowing the sinking rates. Dissolved Mn concentrations are even higher when oxygen levels are low. Overall, dMn concentrations are normally higher in coastal regions and decrease when moving offshore.

=== Soils ===
Manganese occurs in soils in three oxidation states: the divalent cation, Mn^{2+} and as brownish-black oxides and hydroxides containing Mn (III,IV), such as MnOOH and MnO_{2}. Soil pH and oxidation-reduction conditions affect which of these three forms of Mn is dominant in a given soil. At pH values less than 6 or under anaerobic conditions, Mn(II) dominates, while under more alkaline and aerobic conditions, Mn(III,IV) oxides and hydroxides predominate. These effects of soil acidity and aeration state on the form of Mn can be modified or controlled by microbial activity. Microbial respiration can cause both the oxidation of Mn^{2+} to the oxides, and it can cause reduction of the oxides to the divalent cation.

The Mn(III,IV) oxides exist as brownish-black stains and small nodules on sand, silt, and clay particles. These surface coatings on other soil particles have high surface area and carry negative charge. The charged sites can adsorb and retain various cations, especially heavy metals (e.g., Cr^{3+}, Cu^{2+}, Zn^{2+}, and Pb^{2+}). In addition, the oxides can adsorb organic acids and other compounds. The adsorption of the metals and organic compounds can then cause them to be oxidized while the Mn(III,IV) oxides are reduced to Mn^{2+} (e.g., Cr^{3+} to Cr(VI) and colorless hydroquinone to tea-colored quinone polymers).

== Production ==
Manganese production

A significant proportion of the manganese ore mined, around 85% in the United States, is used in iron and steel production, such as in the production of ferromanganese. For the production of ferromanganese, the manganese ore is mixed with iron ore and carbon, and then reduced either in a blast furnace or in an electric arc furnace. The resulting ferromanganese has a manganese content of 30–80%. Pure manganese used for the production of iron-free alloys is produced by leaching manganese ore with sulfuric acid and a subsequent electrowinning process.

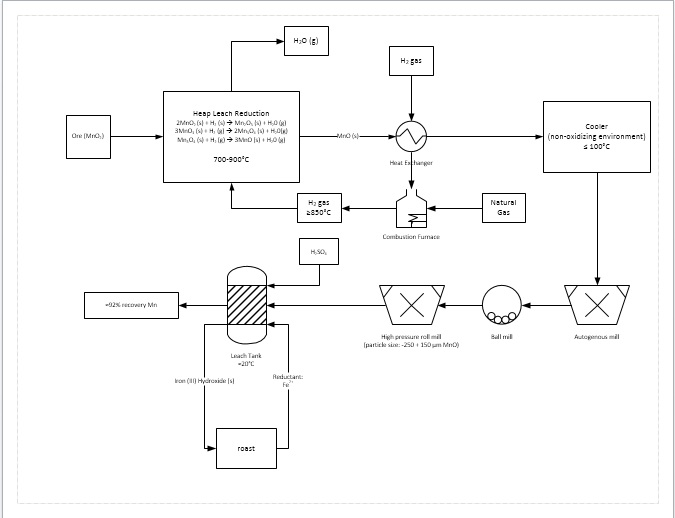
Process flow diagram for a manganese refining circuit

A more progressive extraction process involves directly reducing (a low grade) manganese ore by heap leaching. This is done by percolating natural gas through the bottom of the heap; the natural gas provides the heat (needs to be at least 850 °C) and the reducing agent (carbon monoxide). This reduces all of the manganese ore to Manganese(II) oxide (MnO), which is a leachable form. The ore then travels through a grinding circuit to reduce the particle size of the ore to between 150 and 250 μm, increasing the surface area to aid leaching. The ore is then added to a leach tank of sulfuric acid and ferrous iron (Fe^{2+}) in a 1.6:1 ratio. The iron reacts with the manganese dioxide (MnO_{2}) to form iron hydroxide (FeO(OH)) and elemental manganese (Mn).

This process yields greater than 90% recovery of the manganese. For further purification, the manganese can then be sent to an electrowinning facility.

== Applications ==
=== Steel ===
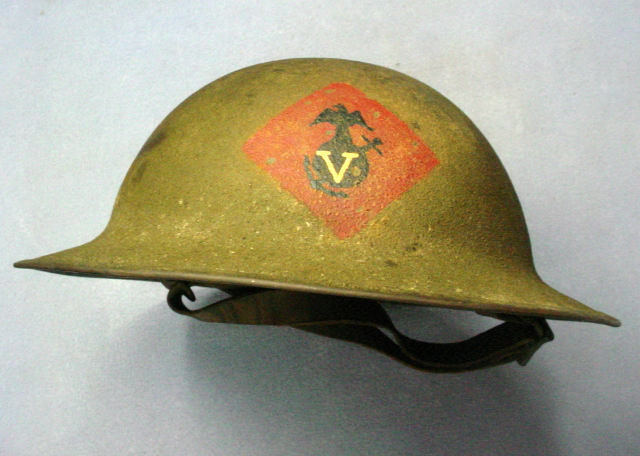
U.S. M1917 combat helmet, a variant of Brodie helmet, made from Hadfield steel manganese alloy

Manganese is essential to iron and steel production by virtue of its sulfur-fixing, deoxidizing, and alloying properties. Manganese has no satisfactory substitute in these applications in metallurgy. Steelmaking, including its ironmaking component, has accounted for most manganese demand, presently in the range of 85% to 90% of the total demand. Manganese is a key component of low-cost stainless steel. Often ferromanganese (usually about 80% manganese) is the intermediate in modern processes.

Small amounts of manganese improve the workability of steel at high temperatures by forming a high-melting sulfide and preventing the formation of a liquid iron sulfide at the grain boundaries. If the manganese content reaches 4%, the embrittlement of the steel becomes a dominant feature. The embrittlement decreases at higher manganese concentrations and reaches an acceptable level at 8%. Steel containing 8 to 15% of manganese has a high tensile strength of up to 863 MPa. Steel with 12% manganese was discovered in 1882 by Robert Hadfield and is still known as Hadfield steel (mangalloy). It was used for British military steel helmets and later by the U.S. military.

=== Aluminium alloys ===
Manganese is used in production of alloys with aluminium. Aluminium with roughly 1.5% manganese has increased resistance to corrosion through grains that absorb impurities which would lead to galvanic corrosion. The corrosion-resistant aluminium alloys 3004 and 3104 (0.8 to 1.5% manganese) are used for most beverage cans. Before 2000, more than 1.6 million tonnes of those alloys were used; at 1% manganese, this consumed 16,000 tonnes of manganese.

=== Batteries ===
Manganese(IV) oxide was used in the original type of dry cell battery as an electron acceptor from zinc, and is the blackish material in carbon–zinc type flashlight cells. The manganese dioxide is reduced to the manganese oxide-hydroxide MnO(OH) during discharging, preventing the formation of hydrogen at the anode of the battery.

MnO_{2} + H_{2}O + e^{−} → MnO(OH) + OH^{−}

The same material also functions in newer alkaline batteries (usually battery cells), which use the same basic reaction, but a different electrolyte mixture. In 2002, more than 230,000 tons of manganese dioxide was used for this purpose.

=== Resistors ===
Copper alloys of manganese, such as Manganin, are commonly found in metal element shunt resistors used for measuring relatively large amounts of current. These alloys have very low temperature coefficient of resistance and are resistant to sulfur. This makes the alloys particularly useful in harsh automotive and industrial environments.

=== Fertilizers and feed additive ===
Manganese oxide and sulfate are components of fertilizers. In the year 2000, an estimated 20,000 tons of these compounds were used in fertilizers in the US alone. A comparable amount of Mn compounds was also used in animal feeds.

=== Niche ===
Methylcyclopentadienyl manganese tricarbonyl is an additive in some unleaded gasoline to boost octane rating and reduce engine knocking.

Manganese(IV) oxide (manganese dioxide, MnO_{2}) is used as a reagent in organic chemistry for the oxidation of benzylic alcohols (where the hydroxyl group is adjacent to an aromatic ring). Manganese dioxide has been used since antiquity to oxidize and neutralize the greenish tinge in glass from trace amounts of iron contamination. MnO_{2} is also used in the manufacture of oxygen and chlorine and in drying black paints. In some preparations, it is a brown pigment for paint and is a constituent of natural umber.

Tetravalent manganese is used as an activator in red-emitting phosphors. While many compounds are known which show luminescence, the majority are not used in commercial application due to low efficiency or deep red emission. However, several Mn^{4+} activated fluorides were reported as potential red-emitting phosphors for warm-white LEDs. But to this day, only K_{2}SiF_{6}:Mn^{4+} is commercially available for use in warm-white LEDs.

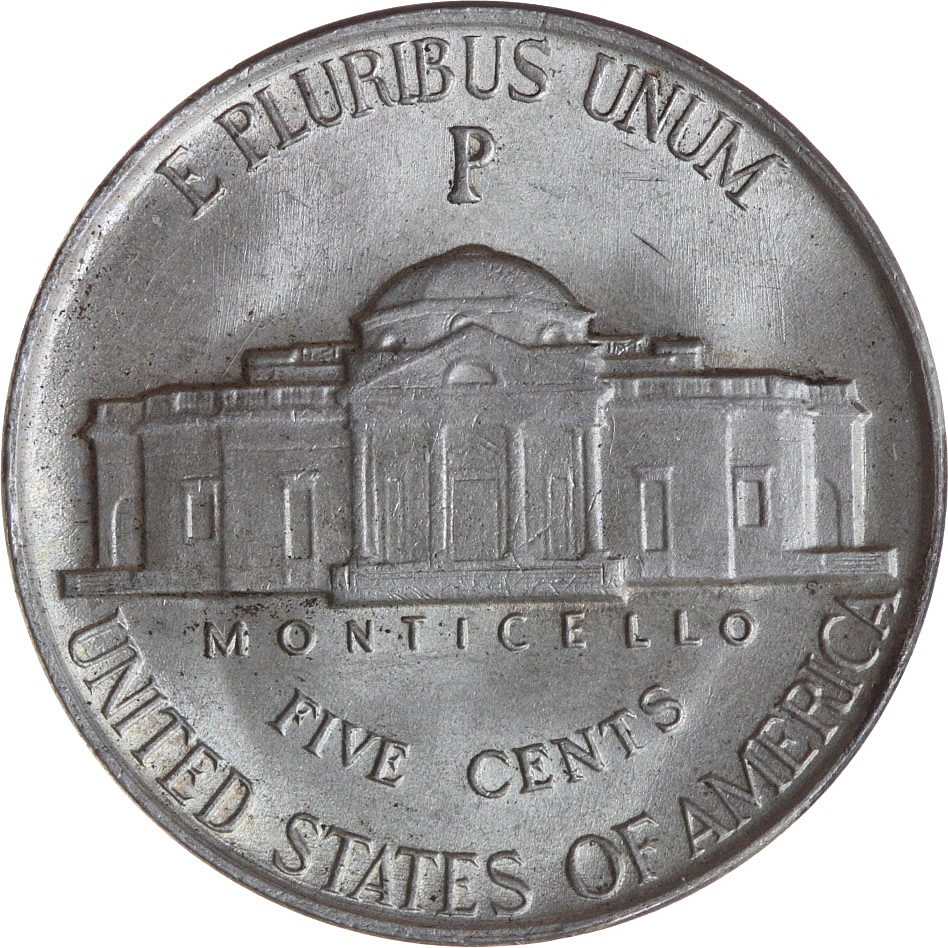
World-War-II-era 5-cent coin (1942-5 identified by mint mark P, D or S above dome) made from a 56% copper-35% silver-9% manganese alloy

The metal is occasionally used in coins; until 2000, the only United States coin to use manganese was the "wartime" nickel from 1942 to 1945. An alloy of 75% copper and 25% nickel was traditionally used for the production of nickel coins. However, because of shortage of nickel metal during the war, it was substituted by more available silver and manganese, thus resulting in an alloy of 56% copper, 35% silver and 9% manganese. Since 2000, dollar coins, for example the Sacagawea dollar and the Presidential $1 coins, are made from a brass containing 7% of manganese with a pure copper core.

Manganese compounds have been used as pigments and for the coloring of ceramics and glass. The brown color of ceramic is sometimes the result of manganese compounds. In the glass industry, manganese compounds are used for two effects. Manganese(III) reacts with iron(II) to reduce strong green color in glass by forming less-colored iron(III) and slightly pink manganese(II), compensating for the residual color of the iron(III). Larger quantities of manganese are used to produce pink colored glass. In 2009, Mas Subramanian and associates at Oregon State University discovered that manganese can be combined with yttrium and indium to form an intensely blue, non-toxic, inert, fade-resistant pigment, YInMn Blue, the first new blue pigment discovered in 200 years.

== Biochemistry ==
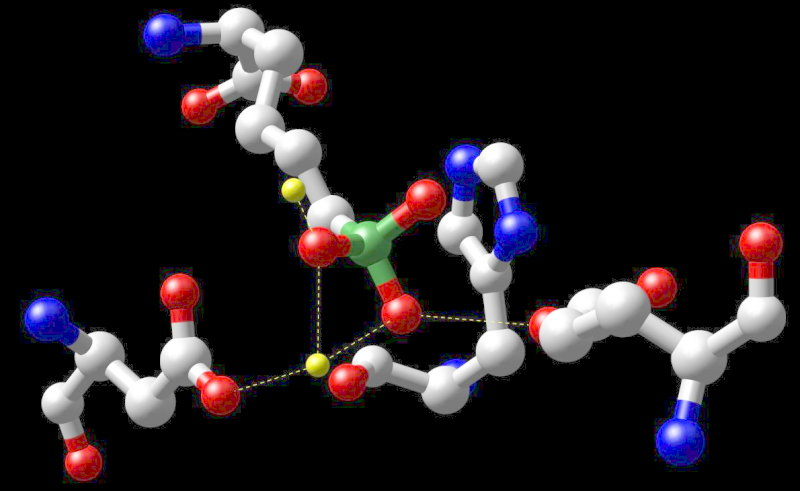
Reactive center of arginase with boronic acid inhibitor – the manganese atoms are shown in yellow.

Many classes of enzymes contain manganese cofactors including oxidoreductases, transferases, hydrolases, lyases, isomerases and ligases. Other enzymes containing manganese are arginase and a Mn-containing superoxide dismutase (Mn-SOD). Some reverse transcriptases of many retroviruses (although not lentiviruses such as HIV) contain manganese. Manganese-containing polypeptides are the diphtheria toxin, lectins, and integrins.

The oxygen-evolving complex (OEC), containing four atoms of manganese, is a part of photosystem II contained in the thylakoid membranes of chloroplasts. The OEC is responsible for the terminal photooxidation of water during the light reactions of photosynthesis, i.e., it is the catalyst that makes the O_{2} produced by plants.

== Human health and nutrition ==
Manganese is an essential human dietary element and is present as a coenzyme in several biological processes, which include macronutrient metabolism, bone formation, and free radical defense systems. Manganese is a critical component in dozens of proteins and enzymes. The human body contains about 12 mg of manganese, mostly in the bones. The soft tissue remainder is concentrated in the liver and kidneys. In the human brain, the manganese is bound to manganese metalloproteins, most notably glutamine synthetase in astrocytes.

Current AIs of Mn by age group and sex
Males		Females	
Age	AI (mg/day)	Age	AI (mg/day)
1–3	1.2	1–3	1.2
4–8	1.5	4–8	1.5
9–13	1.9	9–13	1.6
14–18	2.2	14–18	1.6
19+	2.3	19+	1.8
19+	2.3	19+	pregnant: 2
19+	2.3	19+	lactating: 2.6

=== Regulation ===
The U.S. Institute of Medicine (IOM) updated Estimated Average Requirements (EARs) and Recommended Dietary Allowances (RDAs) for minerals in 2001. For manganese, there was not sufficient information to set EARs and RDAs, so needs are described as estimates for Adequate Intakes (AIs). As for safety, the IOM sets Tolerable upper intake levels (ULs) for vitamins and minerals when evidence is sufficient. In the case of manganese, the adult UL is set at 11 mg/day. Collectively the EARs, RDAs, AIs and ULs are referred to as Dietary Reference Intakes (DRIs). Manganese deficiency is rare.

The European Food Safety Authority (EFSA) refers to the collective set of information as Dietary Reference Values, with Population Reference Intake (PRI) instead of RDA, and Average Requirement instead of EAR. AI and UL are defined the same as in the United States. For people ages 15 and older, the AI is set at 3.0 mg/day. AIs for pregnancy and lactation are 3.0 mg/day. For children ages 1–14 years, the AIs increase with age from 0.5 to 2.0 mg/day. The adult AIs are higher than the U.S. RDAs. The EFSA reviewed the same safety question and decided that there was insufficient information to set a UL.

For U.S. food and dietary supplement labeling purposes, the amount in a serving is expressed as a percent of Daily Value (%DV). For manganese labeling purposes, 100% of the Daily Value was 2.0 mg, but as of 27 May 2016 it was revised to 2.3 mg to bring it into agreement with the RDA. A table of the old and new adult daily values is provided at Reference Daily Intake.

Excessive exposure or intake may lead to a condition known as manganism, a neurodegenerative disorder that causes dopaminergic neuronal death and symptoms similar to Parkinson's disease.

=== Deficiency ===
Manganese deficiency in humans, which is rare, results in a number of medical problems. A deficiency of manganese causes skeletal deformation in animals and inhibits the production of collagen in wound healing.

== Exposure ==
=== In water ===
Waterborne manganese has a greater bioavailability than dietary manganese. According to results from a 2010 study, higher levels of exposure to manganese in drinking water are associated with increased intellectual impairment and reduced intelligence quotients in school-age children. It is hypothesized that long-term exposure due to inhaling the naturally occurring manganese in shower water puts up to 8.7 million Americans at risk. However, data indicates that the human body can recover from certain adverse effects of overexposure to manganese if the exposure is stopped and the body can clear the excess.

Mn levels can increase in seawater when hypoxic periods occur. Since 1990 there have been reports of Mn accumulation in marine organisms including fish, crustaceans, mollusks, and echinoderms. Specific tissues are targets in different species, including the gills, brain, blood, kidney, and liver/hepatopancreas. Physiological effects have been reported in these species. Mn can affect the renewal of immunocytes and their functionality, such as phagocytosis and activation of pro-phenoloxidase, suppressing the organisms' immune systems. This causes the organisms to be more susceptible to infections. As climate change occurs, pathogen distributions increase, and in order for organisms to survive and defend themselves against these pathogens, they need a healthy, strong immune system. If their systems are compromised from high Mn levels, they will not be able to fight off these pathogens and die.

=== Gasoline ===
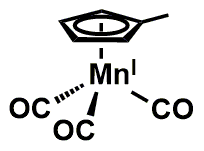
Molecular model of methylcyclopentadienyl manganese tricarbonyl (MMT)

Methylcyclopentadienyl manganese tricarbonyl (MMT) is an additive developed to replace lead compounds for gasolines to improve the octane rating. MMT is used only in a few countries. When exposed to the environment, fuels containing methylcyclopentadienyl manganese tricarbonyl degrade, releasing manganese into water and soils.

=== Air ===
Manganese levels in the air decreased between 1953 and 1982, with higher levels in 1953. In general, breathing air with more than 5 micrograms of manganese per cubic meter can cause symptoms of manganese exposure. In lab-grown human kidney cells, higher levels of a protein called ferroportin are linked to lower manganese levels inside the cells and reduced cell damage, shown by better glutamate uptake and less leakage of a damage marker known as lactate dehydrogenase.

=== Regulation ===
Manganese exposure in United States is regulated by the Occupational Safety and Health Administration (OSHA). People can be exposed to manganese in the workplace by breathing it in or swallowing it. OSHA has set the legal limit (permissible exposure limit) for manganese exposure in the workplace as 5 mg/m^{3} over an 8-hour workday. The National Institute for Occupational Safety and Health (NIOSH) has set a recommended exposure limit (REL) of 1 mg/m^{3} over an 8-hour workday and a short term limit of 3 mg/m^{3}. At levels of 500 mg/m^{3}, manganese is immediately dangerous to life and health. In other countries, such as Germany, a general ceiling value for airborne manganese has been set to 0.5 mg/m^{3} (Maximale Arbeitsplatz-Konzentration) and the maximum level of manganese in the body has been set to 20 mg/L.

== Health and safety ==
Manganese
Hazards
- GHS labelling
Hazard statements	H401
Precautionary statements	P273, P501
NFPA 704 (fire diamond)	0 0 0

Manganese is essential for human health, albeit in milligram amounts. The current maximum safe concentration under U.S. EPA rules is 50 μg Mn/L.

=== Manganism ===
Manganese overexposure is most frequently associated with manganism, a rare neurological disorder associated with excessive manganese ingestion or inhalation. Historically, persons employed in the production or processing of manganese alloys have been at risk for developing manganism; however, health and safety regulations protect workers in developed nations. The disorder was first described in 1837 by British academic John Couper, who studied two patients who were manganese grinders.

Manganism is a biphasic disorder. In its early stages, an intoxicated person may experience depression, mood swings, compulsive behaviors, and psychosis. Early neurological symptoms give way to late-stage manganism, which resembles Parkinson's disease. Symptoms include weakness, monotone and slowed speech, an expressionless face, tremor, forward-leaning gait, inability to walk backwards without falling, rigidity, and general problems with dexterity, gait and balance. Unlike Parkinson's disease, manganism is not associated with loss of the sense of smell and patients are typically unresponsive to treatment with L-DOPA. Symptoms of late-stage manganism become more severe over time even if the source of exposure is removed and brain manganese levels return to normal.

Chronic manganese exposure has been shown to produce a parkinsonism-like illness characterized by movement abnormalities. This condition is not responsive to typical therapies used in the treatment of PD, suggesting an alternative pathway to the typical dopaminergic loss within the substantia nigra. Manganese may accumulate in the basal ganglia, leading to the abnormal movements. A mutation of the SLC30A10 gene, a manganese efflux transporter necessary for decreasing intracellular Mn, has been linked with the development of this Parkinsonism-like disease. The Lewy bodies typical to PD are not seen in Mn-induced parkinsonism.

Animal experiments have given the opportunity to examine the consequences of manganese overexposure under controlled conditions. In (non-aggressive) rats, manganese induces mouse-killing behavior.

=== Toxicity ===
Manganese compounds are less toxic than those of other widespread metals, such as nickel and copper. However, exposure to manganese dusts and fumes should not exceed the ceiling value of 5 mg/m^{3} even for short periods because of its toxicity level. Manganese poisoning has been linked to impaired motor skills and cognitive disorders.

=== Neurodegenerative diseases ===
A protein called DMT1 is the major transporter in manganese absorption from the intestine and may be the major transporter of manganese across the blood–brain barrier. DMT1 also transports inhaled manganese across the nasal epithelium. The proposed mechanism for manganese toxicity is that dysregulation leads to oxidative stress, mitochondrial dysfunction, glutamate-mediated excitotoxicity, and aggregation of proteins.

== See also ==
- Manganese exporter, membrane transport protein
- List of countries by manganese production
- Parkerizing
