= Iron/lead transporter =

The iron/lead transporter (ILT) family (TC# 2.A.108) is a family of transmembrane proteins within the lysine exporter (LysE) superfamily. The ILT family includes two subfamilies, the iron-transporting (OFeT) family (TC# 2.A.108.1) and the lead-transporting (PbrT) family (TC# 2.A.108.2). A representative list of the proteins belonging to these subfamilies of the ILT family can be found in the Transporter Classification Database.

== Iron Transporters ==
Yeast (Saccharomyces cerevisiae, Candida albicans and Schizosaccharomyces pombe) and other fungi possess high affinity (Km ≈ 0.1 μM) Fe^{2+} uptake systems. These systems depend on cell surface ferroxidases to convert extracellular Fe^{2+} to Fe^{3+} which can then be taken up via either a low-affinity (30 μM) transporter of the FeT family (TC #9.A.9) or a high-affinity OFeT family transporter described here. Two gene products are required for high affinity Fe^{2+} transport, Fet3p which is the oxidase, and Ftr1p which is the permease component.

=== Fet3p ===
Fet3p of S. cerevisiae is a multicopper oxidase (636 amino acyl residues) which spans the plasma membrane once (residues 561–584) and has two multicopper oxidase domains (residues 121–141 and 483–494), which possess the ferroxidase activity on the external surface of the plasma membrane. It is a member of the multicopper oxidase family and is therefore homologous to laccase (benzenediol:oxygen oxidoreductase or ligninolytic phenol oxidase), as well as L-ascorbate oxidase, ceruloplasmin and dihydrogeodin oxidase. Its copper binding domain is homologous to that of the PcoA copper binding protein of E. coli.

=== Ftr1p ===
Ftr1p is a protein of 404 amino acyl residues which may span the membrane seven times. It exhibits homology with other yeast open reading frames (ORFs) as well as algal, bacterial and archaeal ORFs. The bacterial and archaeal ORFs are highly divergent from the yeast proteins and may therefore serve dissimilar functions. Recently a bacterial iron transporter has been characterized from a marine magnetotactic α-proteobacterium, but errors in the sequence precluded inclusion of this protein in TCDB.

=== Complex ===
Simultaneous expression of Fet3p and Ftr1p in yeast is required for proper localization of either protein at the cell surface, suggesting that a complex of the two proteins is formed. Both proteins are coordinately regulated, being expressed at high levels when iron is absent and repressed when iron is replete.

=== Function ===
A group translocation reaction in which Fe^{2+} is simultaneously oxidized and transported to Fe^{3+} has been suggested but not demonstrated. Alternatively, Fe^{2+} may be oxidized by Fet3p to Fe^{3+} which may be passed from the Fet3p active site directly to the binding site for Fe^{3+} in Ftr1. Still another possibility is that Fet3p functions only indirectly in transport by allowing membrane insertion, localization or stability of Ftr1p due to the formation of a complex between these two proteins. Regardless of these possibilities, it is not known if a channel or carrier mechanism operates. The nature of the energy coupling process for transport is not established.

A bipartite iron uptake system, FetM (646 aas; 8 TMSs in a 1 + 7 arrangement)/FetP (a periplasmic protein that enhances iron uptake by FetM) (TC# 2.A.108.2.10) has been characterized. FetP binds Cu^{2+} and Mn^{2+} at two different sites, 1.3 Å apart, in this homodimeric protein. The 3-d structure with two Cu^{2+} bound to each of the two subunits revealed different geometries at the two sites. FetMP may be an iron permease with an iron scavenging function, and possibly also an iron reducing function.

=== Transport Reaction ===
The generalized transport reaction for the OFeT family is:

(1) Fe^{3+} (out) → Fe^{3+} (in), or

(2) Fe^{2+} (out) + 1/4 O_{2} (out) → Fe^{3+} (in) + 1/2 H_{2}O (out).

== Lead Transporters ==
=== PbrT ===
A single protein, PbrT (TC# 2.A.108.2.1), encoded within the lead resistance locus of Ralstonia metallidurans CH34, serves as the prototype for the PbrT family. This protein, when overexpressed, increases sensitivity to Pb^{2+}. The protein exhibits a single N-terminal hydrophobic segment (a putative TMS), plus 6 additional putative TMSs in the C-terminal region (residues 420–650) of this 652 aas protein. An N-terminal region (residues 100–218) shows sequence similarity to the C-terminal cytochrome C6 domain of the diheme c-type cytochrome, FixP (A8HZ17), of Azorhizobium caulinodans (30% identity). The C-terminal transmembrane domain (residues 223–619) shows sequence similarity to members of the oxidase-dependent Fe^{2+} transporter, OFeT, family (TC# 2.A.108) including the Ftr1 iron transporter of Saccharomyces cerevisiae (TC# 2.A.108.1.1) (30% identity). Thus, PbrT is related to the OFeT family, both structurally and functionally. An N-terminal domain (residues 100–218 in the R. metallidurans protein) shows similarity to the C-terminal cytochrome C6 domain in the diheme c-type cytochrome, FixP of Azorhizobium caulinodans.

=== Transport Reaction ===
The generalized transport reactions catalyzed by members of the PbrT family are:

(1) Pb^{2+} (out) → Pb^{2+} (in), and

(2) Fe^{2+} (out) → Fe^{2+} (in).

== See also ==
- Transport protein
- Solute Carrier Family
- Transporter Classification Database
