= Cadmium resistance transporter =

Cadmium Resistance Protein

Identifiers
- Symbol: CadD
- Pfam: PF03596
- InterPro: IPR004676
- TCDB: 2.A.77
Available protein structures:
- PDB: IPR004676 PF03596 (ECOD; PDBsum)
- AlphaFold: IPR004676; PF03596

The cadmium resistance (CadD) protein family (TC# 2.A.77) belongs to the Lysine exporter (LysE) superfamily. CadD members facilitate the export of cationic compounds such as cadmium ions.

== Members ==
Currently, many sequenced proteins comprise the CadD family. Two are close orthologues in two Staphylococcus species that have been reported to function in cadmium resistance, a fourth has been reported to function in quaternary ammonium cation export, and the fourth is a distant open reading frame (ORF) in Staphylococcus aureus. These proteins are found in Gram-positive bacteria. Their mode of energy coupling has not been investigated, but is hypothesized to include a proton antiport mechanism. This family is distantly related to members of the LysE family (TC #2.A.75) and the RhtB family (TC #2.A.76). These three families, which are included in the LysE superfamily, all consist of proteins of similar sizes (about 200 residues) and topologies (6 putative transmembrane α-helical segments; 5 experimentally determined TMSs).

== General Transport Reaction ==
The probable reaction catalyzed by these proteins is:

Cationic compound (in) + nH^{+} (out) → Cationic compound (out) + nH^{+} (in).
