= Bacterial murein precursor exporter =

Family of transport proteins

The bacterial murein precursor exporter (MPE) family (TC# 2.A.103) is a member of the cation diffusion facilitator (CDF) superfamily of membrane transporters. Members of the MPE family are found in a large variety of Gram-negative and Gram-positive bacteria and facilitate the translocation of lipid-linked murein (aka peptidoglycan) precursors. A representative list of proteins belonging to the MPE family can be found in the Transporter Classification Database.

== Structure ==
Members of the MPE family consist of 370-420 amino acyl residues with 9 (RodA; TC# 2.A.103.1.2) or 10 (FtsW; TC# 2.A.103.1.1) putative transmembrane α-helical spanners. Experimental evidence for a 10 TMS model has been reported for FtsW of Streptococcus pneumoniae. The S. pneumoniae protein has both its N- and C-termini in the cytoplasm, a large (~ 60 residue) cytoplasmic domain between TMSs 4 and 5, and a large (~ 80 residue) extracytoplasmic loop between TMSs 7 and 8.

== Function ==
Bacterial cell growth necessitates synthesis of peptidoglycan. Assembly of peptidoglycan is a multistep process starting in the cytoplasm and ending in the exterior cell surface. The intracellular part of the pathway results in the production of the membrane-anchored cell wall precursor, Lipid II. After synthesis, this lipid intermediate is translocated across the cell membrane. The translocation (flipping) step of Lipid II requires a specific protein (flippase). Mohammadi et al. (2011) showed that the integral membrane protein FtsW (TC# 2.A.103.1.1,4-7), an essential protein for cell division, is a transporter of the lipid-linked peptidoglycan precursors across the cytoplasmic membrane. Using E. coli membrane vesicles, they found that transport of Lipid II requires the presence of FtsW, and purified FtsW induced the transbilayer movement of Lipid II in model membranes.

The best-characterized members of the family are the FtsW cell division protein, the RodA rod shape determining protein (both of E. coli; TC# 2.A.103.1.2) and the SpoVE protein of B. subtilis (TC# 2.A.103.1.3). They have been shown to function in the translocation (export) of lipid-linked murein precursors such as NAG-NAM-pentapeptide pyrophosphoryl undecaprenol (lipid II). They interact with murein synthases as well as two transpeptidases (PBP2 and PBP3). In Gram-negative bacteria the ftsW gene is physically linked to murG (TC# 9.B.146), which is responsible for the final cytoplasmic step in the synthesis of lipid II before it is flipped to the periplasmic side of the membrane. They may therefore be part of a tunneling device directing the flow of murein precursors to the membrane enzymes that insert the precursors into the preexisting murein sacculus.

=== Transport reaction ===
The following reaction is catalyzed by the proteins of the MPE family.

Lipid-linked murein precursor (in) → Lipid-linked murein precursor (out)

== See also ==
- Peptidoglycan
- Transporter Classification Database
