= Manganese deficiency (medicine) =

- Specialty: Endocrinology

Manganese deficiency in humans results in several medical problems. Manganese is a vital element of nutrition in very small quantities (adult male daily intake 2.3 milligrams). However, poisoning may occur when greater amounts are ingested.

== Function ==
Manganese is a component of some enzymes (such as arginase) and stimulates the development and activity of other enzymes. Manganese superoxide dismutase (MnSOD) is the principal antioxidant in mitochondria. Several enzymes activated by manganese contribute to the metabolism of carbohydrates, amino acids, and cholesterol.

A deficiency of manganese causes skeletal deformation in animals and inhibits the production of collagen in wound healing.

== Food sources ==
Manganese is found in leafy green vegetables, fruits, nuts, cinnamon, and whole grains. The nutritious kernel, called wheat germ, which contains the most minerals and vitamins of the grain, has been removed from most processed grains (such as white bread). The wheat germ is often sold as livestock feed. Many common vitamin and mineral supplement products fail to include manganese in their compositions. Relatively high dietary intake of other minerals such as iron, magnesium, and calcium may inhibit the proper intake of manganese.
