= Peptidoglycolipid addressing protein =

Protein family

The Peptidoglycolipid Addressing Protein (GAP) Family is a member of the Lysine Exporter (LysE) Superfamily. It is listed as item 2.A.116 in the Transporter Classification Database. The mechanism of its action is not known, but this family has been shown to be a member of the LsyE superfamily. Therefore, these proteins are most likely secondary carriers.

The proposed generalized reaction catalyzed by members of the GAP family is:

PGL (in) → PGL (outer membrane).

== See also ==
- Transport Protein
- Glycolipid
