= NicO transporters =

Member of the Lysine Exporter (LysE) Superfamily

The Nickel/Cobalt Transporter (NicO) Family is a member of the Lysine Exporter (LysE) Superfamily.

== Homology ==
Homologues of the NicO family have differing predicted topologies: 6, 7 and 8 TMSs. One such homologue, RcnA (YohM; TC# 2.A.113.1.1) of E. coli (274 aas) has 6 putative transmembrane segments (TMSs) in a 3 + 3 arrangement with a large hydrophilic loop between putativeTMSs 3 and 4. Several homologues of RcnA (e.g., RcnA homologue from Ralstonia solanacearum; TC# 2.A.113.1.3; CAD17703) have 7 putative TMSs (4 + 3). Still another homologue, UreH of Methanocaldococcus janaschii (TC# 2.A.113.1.4) has 6 putative TMSs in a more characteristic 3 + 3 TMS arrangement. The NicO family within the LysE superfamily may have a common origin with the TOG superfamily, having lost TMSs 1 and 4 in the 8 TMS TOG superfamily topology.

== Function ==
This protein is believed to catalyze Co^{2+} and Ni^{2+} efflux.

The overall reaction catalyzed by proteins of the NicO family is probably:

[Ni^{2+} or Co^{2+}] (in) → [Ni^{2+} or Co^{2+}] (out).

== See also ==
- NiCoT family, family of nickel/cobalt transporters within the TOG superfamily
- Nickel
- Cobalt
- Transporter Classification Database
- Transport protein
