= Disulfide oxidoreductase D =

Disulfide bond oxidoreductase D

Identifiers
- Symbol: DsbD
- Pfam: PF02683
- TCDB: 5.A.1
- OPM superfamily: 248
- OPM protein: 2n4x
Available protein structures:
- PDB: PF02683 (ECOD; PDBsum)
- AlphaFold: PF02683

The Disulfide bond oxidoreductase D (DsbD) family is a member of the Lysine Exporter (LysE) Superfamily. A representative list of proteins belonging to the DsbD family can be found in the Transporter Classification Base.

== Homology ==
Homologues include:

(1) several thiol-disulfide exchange proteins (i.e., TC# 5.A.1.1.1)

(2) the cytochrome c-type biogenesis proteins, CcdA (TC# 5.A.1.2.1) of Paracoccus pantotrophus and Bacillus subtilis.

(3) the methylamine utilization proteins, MauF (TC# 5.A.1.3.1) of Paracoccus denitrificans and P. versutus.

(4) the mercury resistance proteins (TC# 5.A.1.4.1; possibly Hg^{2+} transporters) of Mycobacterium tuberculosis and Streptomyces lividans.

(5) suppressors of copper sensitivity (TC# 5.A.1.5.1; copper tolerance proteins) of Salmonella typhimurium and Vibrio cholerae.

(6) components of peroxide reduction pathways (TC# 5.A.1.5.2), and

(7) components of sulfenic acid reductases.

== Disulfide bond oxidoreductase D (DsbD) ==
The best characterized member of the DsbD family is DsbD of E. coli (TC# 5.A.1.1.1). The DsbD protein is membrane-embedded with a putative N-terminal transmembrane segment (TMS) plus 8 additionalTMSs. The smallest homologues (190 aas with 6 putative TMSs) are found in archaea, while the largest are found in both Gram-negative bacteria (758 aas with 9 putative TMSs) and Gram-positive bacteria (695 aas with 6 putative TMSs).

The overall vectorial electron transfer reaction catalyzed by DsbD is:

2 e^{−}_{cytoplasm} → 2 e^{−}_{periplasm}

=== Structure ===
DsbB contains 4 essential cysteine residues, reversibly forming two disulfide bonds. Although DsbA displays no proofreading activity for repair of wrongly paired disulfides, DsbC, DsbE and DsbG have been found to demonstrate proofreading activity. Therefore, the two transmembrane pathways involving DsbD and DsbB together catalyze extracellular disulfide reduction (DsbD) and oxidation (DsbB) in a superficially reversible process that allows dithiol/disulfide exchange.

=== System reduction pathway ===
In the E. coli DsbD system, electrons are transferred from NADPH in the cytoplasm to periplasmic dithiol/disulfide-containing proteins via an electron transfer chain that sequentially involves NADPH, thioredoxin reductase (TrxB; present in the cytoplasm), thioredoxin (TrxA; also in the cytoplasm), DsbD (the integral membrane constituent of the system), and the periplasmic electron acceptors (DsbC, DsbE (CcmG) and DsbG).

All of these last three proteins (DsbC, DsbE (CcmG) and DsbG) can donate electrons to oxidized disulfide-containing proteins in the periplasm of a Gram-negative bacterium or presumably in the external milieu of a Gram-positive bacterium or an archaeon.

Thus, the pathway is:

NADPH → TrxB → TrxA → DsbD → (DsbC, DsbE, or DsbG) → proteins.

DsbD contains three cysteine pairs that undergo reversible disulfide rearrangements. TrxA donates electrons to the transmembrane cysteines C163 (C3) and C285 (C5) in putative TMSs 1 and 4 in the DsbD model proposed by Katzen and Beckwith (2000). This dithiol then donates electrons to the periplasmic C-terminal thioredoxin motif (CXXC) of DsbD, thereby reducing C461 and C464 (C6 and C7, respectively). This dithiol pair attacks the periplasmic N-terminal disulfide bridge at C103 and C109 (C1 and C2, respectively) which transfers electrons to DsbC and other protein electron acceptors as noted above.

=== Reverse pathway ===
DsbD catalyses an essentially irreversible reaction due to the fact that electrons flow down their electrochemical gradient from inside the cell (negative inside) to outside the cell (positive outside). In order to reverse the reaction, electrons are transferred from dithiol proteins in the periplasm to an electron acceptor in the cytoplasm as follows:

reduced protein_{periplasm} → DsbA_{periplasm} → DsbB_{membrane} → quinones_{membrane} → reductase_{membrane}→ terminal electron acceptor_{cytoplasm} (e.g., O_{2}, NO^{−}_{3} or fumarate).

== See also ==
- Oxidoreductase
- Redox
- Disulfide
- DsbA
- Transporter Classification Database
