= Cation diffusion facilitator =

Large group of transport proteins

Cation_efflux

Identifiers
- Symbol: Cation_efflux
- Pfam: PF01545
- Pfam clan: CL0184
- InterPro: IPR002524
- TCDB: 2.A.4
- OPM superfamily: 183
- OPM protein: 3h90
Available protein structures:
- PDB: IPR002524 PF01545 (ECOD; PDBsum)
- AlphaFold: IPR002524; PF01545

Cation diffusion facilitators (CDFs) are transmembrane proteins that provide tolerance of cells to divalent metal ions, such as cadmium, zinc, and cobalt. These proteins are considered to be efflux pumps that remove these divalent metal ions from cells. However, some members of the CDF superfamily are implicated in ion uptake. All members of the CDF family possess six putative transmembrane spanners with strongest conservation in the four N-terminal spanners. The Cation Diffusion Facilitator (CDF) Superfamily includes the following families:

- 1.A.52 - The Ca^{2+} Release-activated Ca^{2+} (CRAC) Channel (CRAC-C) Family
- 2.A.4 - The Cation Diffusion Facilitator (CDF) Family
- 2.A.19 - The Ca^{2+}:Cation Antiporter (CaCA) Family
- 2.A.103 - The Bacterial Murein Precursor Exporter (MPE) Family

== The Cation Diffusion Facilitator (CDF) Family ==
The CDF family (TC# 2.A.4) is a ubiquitous family, members of which are found in bacteria, archaea and eukaryotes. They transport heavy metal ions, such as cadmium, zinc, cobalt, nickel, copper and mercuric ions. There are 9 mammalian paralogues, ZnT1 - 8 and 10. Most proteins from the family have six transmembrane helices, but MSC2 of S. cerevisiae) and Znt5 and hZTL1 of H. sapiens have 15 and 12 predicted TMSs, respectively. These proteins exhibit an unusual degree of sequence divergence and size variation (300-750 residues). Eukaryotic proteins exhibit differences in cell localization. Some catalyze heavy metal uptake from the cytoplasm into various intracellular eukaryotic organelles (ZnT2-7) while others (ZnT1) catalyze efflux from the cytoplasm across the plasma membrane into the extracellular medium. Thus, some are found in plasma membranes while others are in organellar membranes such as vacuoles of plants and yeast and the golgi of animals. They catalyze cation:proton antiport, have a single essential zinc-binding site within the transmembrane domains of each monomer within the dimer, and have a binuclear zinc-sensing and binding site in the cytoplasmic C-terminal region. A representative list of proteins belonging to the CDF family can be found in the Transporter Classification Database.

=== Phylogeny ===
Prokaryotic and eukaryotic proteins cluster separately but may function with the same polarity by similar mechanisms. These proteins are secondary carriers which utilize the proton motive force (pmf) and function by H^{+} antiport (for metal efflux). One member, CzcD of Bacillus subtilis (TC# 2.A.4.1.3) , has been shown to exchange the divalent cation (Zn^{2+} or Cd^{2+} ) for two monovalent cations (K^{+} and H^{+} ) in an electroneutral process energized by the transmembrane pH gradient. Another, ZitB of E. coli (TC #2.A.4.1.4), has been reconstituted in proteoliposomes and studied kinetically. It appears to function by simple Me^{2+}:H^{+} antiport with a 1:1 stoichiometry.

Montanini et al. (2007) have conducted a phylogenetic analysis of CDF family members. Their analysis revealed three major and two minor phylogenetic groups. They suggest that the three major groups segregated according to metal ion specificity:

1. Mn^{2+}
2. Fe^{2+} and Zn^{2+} as well as other metal ions
3. Zn^{2+} plus other metals, but not Iron.

=== Structure ===
X-ray structure of YiiP of E. coli represents a homodimer.

Coudray et al. (2013) used cryoelectron microscopy to determine a 13 Å resolution structure of a YiiP homolog from Shewanella oneidensis within a lipid bilayer in the absence of Zn^{2+}. Starting from the x-ray structure in the presence of Zn^{2+}, they used molecular dynamic flexible fitting to build a model. A comparison of the structures suggested a conformational change that involves pivoting of a transmembrane, four-helix bundle (M1, M2, M4, and M5) relative to the M3-M6 helix pair. Although the accessibility of transport sites in the x-ray model indicates that it represents an outward-facing state, their model was consistent with an inward-facing state, suggesting that the conformational change is relevant to the alternating access mechanism for transport. They speculated that the dimer may coordinate the rearrangement of the transmembrane helices.

Involved in metal tolerance/resistance by efflux, most CDF proteins share a two-modular architecture consisting of a transmembrane domain (TMD) and a C-terminal domain (CTD) that protrudes into the cytoplasm. A Zn^{2+} and Cd^{2+} CDF transporter from the marine bacterium, Maricaulis maris, that does not possess the CTD is a member of a new, CTD-lacking subfamily of CDFs.

=== Transport Reaction ===
The generalized transport reaction for CDF family members is:

Me^{2+} (in) H^{+} (out) ± K^{+} (out) → Me^{2+} (out) H^{+} (in) ± K^{+} (in).

== See also ==
- Integral membrane protein
- Ion channel
- Transporter Classification Database
- Protein superfamily
- Protein family
