= Tellurium ion resistance =

Family of transport proteins

The Tellurium Ion Resistance (TerC) Family (TC# 2.A.109) is part of the Lysine Exporter (LysE) Superfamily. A representative list of proteins belonging to the TerC family can be found in the Transporter Classification Database.

== TerC ==
The TerC family (Pfam 03741) includes the E. coli TerC protein (TC# 2.A.109.1.1) which has been implicated in tellurium resistance. It is hypothesized to catalyze efflux of tellurium ions. TerC is encoded by plasmid pTE53 from a clinical isolate of E. coli. It has 346 amino acyl residues (aas) and 9 putative transmembrane segments (TMSs) with a large hydrophilic loop between TMSs 5 and 6.

A homologue in Arabidopsis thaliana (TC# 9.A.30.2.1) may function in prothylakoid membrane biogenises during early chloroplast development. It has 384 aas and 7-8 putative TMSs. In E. coli, TerC forms a membrane complex with TerB as well as DctA, PspA, HslU, and RplK. The TerB/TerC complex may link different functional modules with biochemical activities of C4-dicarboxylate transport, inner membrane stress response (phage shock protein regulatory complex), ATPase/chaperone activity, and proteosynthesis. It may be part of a metal sensing stress response system. The co-presence of TerC and TerE but not TerF correlates with tellurite resistance when several hundred bacterial strains were assayed.

=== Function ===
The reaction proposed to be catalyzed by TerC is:

tellurium ions (in) → tellurium ions (out).

== See also ==
- Tellurium
- Isotopes of tellurium
- Efflux (microbiology)
