= Manganese poisoning =

Manganism
- The element manganese in the periodic table
- Specialty: Occupational medicine
- Diagnostic method: assessment of exposure history presentation of symptoms MRI neurological examination

Manganese poisoning, also called manganism or manganese madness, is a toxic condition resulting from chronic exposure to manganese. It was first identified in 1837 by James Couper.

== Signs and symptoms ==
Chronic exposure to excessive manganese levels can lead to a variety of psychiatric and motor disturbances, termed manganism. Generally, exposure to ambient manganese air concentrations from 1 - 5 mg/m^{3} can lead to manganese-induced symptoms, but neurotoxicity has been reported with occupational exposure as low as 0.03 mb/m^{3}.

In initial stages of manganism, neurological symptoms consist of reduced response speed, irritability, mood changes, and compulsive behaviors. Upon protracted exposure neurological symptoms are more prominent and resemble those of Parkinson's disease. There are particular differences in both the symptoms and manganese poisoning does not respond levodopa treatment used for Parkinson's disease.

== Causes ==
Manganese poisoning is primarily as consequence of occupational exposure, especially in manganese dioxide mining and smelting. Exposure may also occur during the manufacture of manganese steel, electrical coils, or during the production of potassium permanganate.

=== Welding ===
Studies of a large number of Danish and of Swedish welders and welders at Caterpillar, Inc. fail to show any link between employment as a welder and manganism (or other neurological problems). Manganism has become an active issue in workplace safety as it has been the subject of numerous product liability lawsuits against manufacturers of arc welding supplies. In these lawsuits, welders have accused the manufacturers of failing to provide adequate warning that their products could cause welding fumes to contain dangerously high manganese concentrations that could lead welders to develop manganism. Companies employing welders are also being sued, for what colloquially is known as "welders' disease."

=== Illicit methcathinone manufacturing ===
Manganism is also documented in reports of illicit methcathinone manufacturing. This is due to manganese being a byproduct of methcathinone synthesis if potassium permanganate is used as an oxidiser. Symptoms include apathy, bradykinesia, gait disorder with postural instability, and spastic-hypokinetic dysarthria. Another street drug sometimes contaminated with manganese is the so-called "Bazooka", prepared by free-base methods from cocaine using manganese carbonate.

=== Drinking water, fuel additive, Maneb, paint and steelmaking ===
Reports also mention such sources as contaminated drinking water, and fuel additive methylcyclopentadienyl manganese tricarbonyl (MMT), which on combustion becomes partially converted into manganese phosphates and sulfate that go airborne with the exhaust, and manganese ethylene-bis-dithiocarbamate (Maneb), a pesticide. It is found in large quantities in paint and steelmaking processes.

And in very rare cases it can be caused by a defect of the gene SLC30A10.

== Pathophysiology ==
Manganese may affect liver function, but the threshold of acute toxicity is very high. On the other hand, more than 95 percent of manganese is eliminated by biliary excretion. Any existing liver damage may slow this process, increasing its concentration in blood plasma. The exact neurotoxic mechanism of manganese is uncertain but there are clues pointing at the interaction of manganese with iron, zinc, aluminum, and copper. Based on a number of studies, disturbed iron metabolism could underlie the neurotoxic action of manganese. Manganese displaces Iron in the COQ7 hydroxylase enzyme required for coenzyme Q10 synthesis. Supplying CoQ6 (the yeast version of CoQ10) to yeast cells bathed in manganese solution restored mitochondrial function and survival.

It participates in Fenton reactions and could thus induce oxidative damage, a hypothesis corroborated by the evidence from studies of affected welders. A study of the exposed workers showed that they have significantly fewer children. This may indicate that long-term accumulation of manganese affects fertility. Pregnant animals repeatedly receiving high doses of manganese bore malformed offspring significantly more often compared to controls.

== Diagnosis ==
Diagnosis requires a high clinical suspicion alongside recognition of the risk factors placing patients at risk for manganism. Ideal evaluation for the determination of manganese toxicity includes a team-based approach, based on early recognition and outpatient referral to neurology for definitive care. Early consultation with a clinical toxicologist may aid in the identification of the etiology for the patient's symptoms. Usage of MRI or serum-based studies should be done at the request of specialists familiar with toxicity and the latest research.

== Treatment ==
The current mainstay of manganism treatment is levodopa and chelation with EDTA. Both have limited and at best transient efficacy. Replenishing the deficit of dopamine with levodopa has been shown to initially improve extrapyramidal symptoms, but the response to treatment goes down after 2 or 3 years, with worsening condition of the same patients noted even after 10 years since last exposure to manganese. Enhanced excretion of manganese prompted by chelation therapy brings its blood levels down but the symptoms remain largely unchanged, raising questions about efficacy of this form of treatment.

Increased ferroportin protein expression in human embryonic kidney (HEK293) cells is associated with decreased intracellular manganese concentration and attenuated cytotoxicity, characterized by the reversal of manganese-reduced glutamate uptake and diminished lactate dehydrogenase (LDH) leakage.

== See also ==
- Alpha synuclein
- Asphalt (disambiguation)
- Concrete
- Joss paper
- Parkinsonism
- Particulates
- Slag
- Slag cement
