= Calcium:cation antiporter =

Family of transport proteins

The Ca^{2+}:cation antiporter (CaCA) family (TC# 2.A.19) is a member of the cation diffusion facilitator (CDF) superfamily. This family should not be confused with the Ca^{2+}:H^{+} Antiporter-2 (CaCA2) Family (TC# 2.A.106) which belongs to the Lysine Exporter (LysE) Superfamily. Proteins of the CaCA family are found ubiquitously, having been identified in animals, plants, yeast, archaea and divergent bacteria. Members of this family facilitate the antiport of calcium ion with another cation.

== Homology ==
Members of the CaCA family exhibit widely divergent sequences. Several homologues show to have arisen by a tandem intragenic duplication event. The most conserved portions of this repeat element, α1 and α2, are found in putative TMSs 2-3 and TMSs 7-8. These conserved sequences are important for transport function and may form an intramembranous pore/loop-like structure. These carriers function primarily in Ca^{2+} extrusion.

The phylogenetic tree for the CaCA family reveals at least six major branches. Two clusters consist exclusively of animal proteins, a third contains several bacterial and archaeal proteins, a fourth possesses yeast, plant and blue green bacterial homologues, the fifth contains only the ChaA Ca^{2+}:H^{+} antiporter of E. coli and the sixth contains only one distant S. cerevisiae homologue of unknown function. Several homologues may be present in a single organism. This fact and the shape of the tree suggest either that isoforms of these proteins arose by gene duplication before the three domains of life split off from each other or that horizontal gene transfer has occurred between these domains.

Homologues from several cyanobacteria have been characterized. They play important roles in salt tolerance.

=== Subfamilies ===
The CaCA family is composed of at least five subfamilies:

1. K^{+}-independent exchangers
2. Na^{+}/Ca^{2+} exchangers (NCXs)
3. Cation/Ca^{2+} exchangers (CCXs),
4. YBRG transporters
5. Cation exchangers (CAXs)

A representative list of CaCA family members can be found in the Transporter Classification Database.

== Structure ==
Members of the CaCA family vary in size from 302 amino acyl residues (Methanococcus jannaschii) to 1199 residues (Bos taurus). Even within the animal kingdom, they vary in size from 461 to 1199 residues. The bacterial and archaeal proteins are in general smaller than the eukaryotic proteins. They have been suggested to traverse the membrane 9 (mammals) or 10 (bacteria) times as α-helical spanners, but some plant homologues (Cax1 and Cax2, i.e., TC#s 2.A.19.2.3 and 2.A.19.2.4, respectively, of Arabidopsis thaliana) exhibit 11 putative TMSs. The E. coli ChaB (YrbG; TC# 2.A.19.5.1) homologue has been found to have 10 TMSs with both the N- and C-termini localized to the periplasm. Each homologous half of the internally duplicated protein has 5 TMSs with opposite orientation in the membrane. This orientation seems to be stabilized by the presence of positively charged residues in the cytoplasmic loops.

The mammalian cardiac muscle homologue probably has 9 TMSs. The N-terminus of this protein is believed to be extracellular, while the C-terminus is intracellular. A large central loop is not required for transport function and plays a role in regulation. In the preferred 9 TMS model for this mammalian protein, the polypeptide chain loops into the membrane after TMS 2 and after TMS 7. The large central loop separates TMS 5 from TMS 6. TMS 2 and the following loop show sequence similarity to TMS 7 and its loop. TMS 7 may be close to TMSs 2 and 3 in the 3-D structure of the protein.

== Function ==
The Na^{+}:Ca^{2+} exchanger plays a central role in cardiac contractility by maintaining Ca^{2+} homeostasis. Two Ca^{2+}-binding domains, CBD1 and CBD2, located in a large intracellular loop, regulate activity of the exchanger. Ca^{2+} binding to these regulatory domains activates the transport of Ca^{2+} across the plasma membrane. The structure of CBD1 shows four Ca^{2+} ions arranged in a tight planar cluster. The structure of CBD2 in the Ca^{2+}-bound (1.7 Å resolution) and Ca^{2+}-free (1.4 Å resolution) conformations shows (like CBD1) a classical Ig fold but coordinates only two Ca^{2+} ions in primary and secondary Ca^{2+} sites. In the absence of Ca^{2+}, Lys585 stabilizes the structure by coordinating two acidic residues (Asp552 and Glu648), one from each of the Ca^{2+}-binding sites, and prevents protein unfolding.

All of the characterized animal proteins catalyze Ca^{2+}:Na^{+} exchange although some also transport K^{+}. The NCX plasma membrane proteins exchange 3 Na^{+} for 1 Ca^{2+} (i.e., TC# 2.A.19.3). Mammalian Na^{+}/Ca^{2+} exchangers exist as three isoforms NCX1-3 which are about 70% identical to each other. The NCKX exchangers exchange 1 Ca^{2+} plus 1 K^{+} for four Na^{+} (i.e., TC# 2.A.19.4). The myocyte NCX1.1 splice variant catalyzes Ca^{2+} extrusion during cardiac relaxation and may catalyze Ca^{2+} influx during contraction. The E. coli ChaA (TC# 2.A.19.1.1) protein catalyzes Ca^{2+}:H^{+} antiport but may also catalyze Na^{+}:H^{+} antiport slowly. All remaining well-characterized members of the family catalyze Ca^{2+}:H^{+} exchange.

The Na^{+}/Ca^{2+} exchanger, NCX1 (TC# 2.A.19.3.1), is a plasma membrane protein that regulates intracellular Ca^{2+} levels in cardiac myocytes. Transport activity is regulated by Ca^{2+}, and the primary Ca^{2+} sensor (CBD1) is located in a large cytoplasmic loop connecting two transmembrane helices. The high-affinity binding of Ca^{2+} to the CBD1 sensory domain results in conformational changes that stimulate the exchanger to extrude Ca^{2+}. A crystal structure of CBD1 at 2.5 Å resolution reveals a novel Ca^{2+} binding site consisting of four Ca^{2+} ions arranged in a tight planar cluster. This intricate coordination pattern for a Ca^{2+} binding cluster is indicative of a highly sensitive Ca^{2+} sensor and may represent a general platform for Ca^{2+} sensing.

The human Na^{+}:Ca^{2+} exchangers, when defective, can cause neurodegenerative disorders. Allosteric activation of NCX involves the binding of cytosolic Ca^{2+} to regulatory domains CBD1 and CBD2.

== Transport reaction ==
The generalized transport reaction catalyzed by proteins of the CaCA family is:

Ca^{2+} (in) + [nH^{+} or nNa^{+} (out)] ⇌ Ca^{2+} (out) + [nH^{+} or nNa^{+}] (in).
