= Pentacarbonylhydridomanganese =

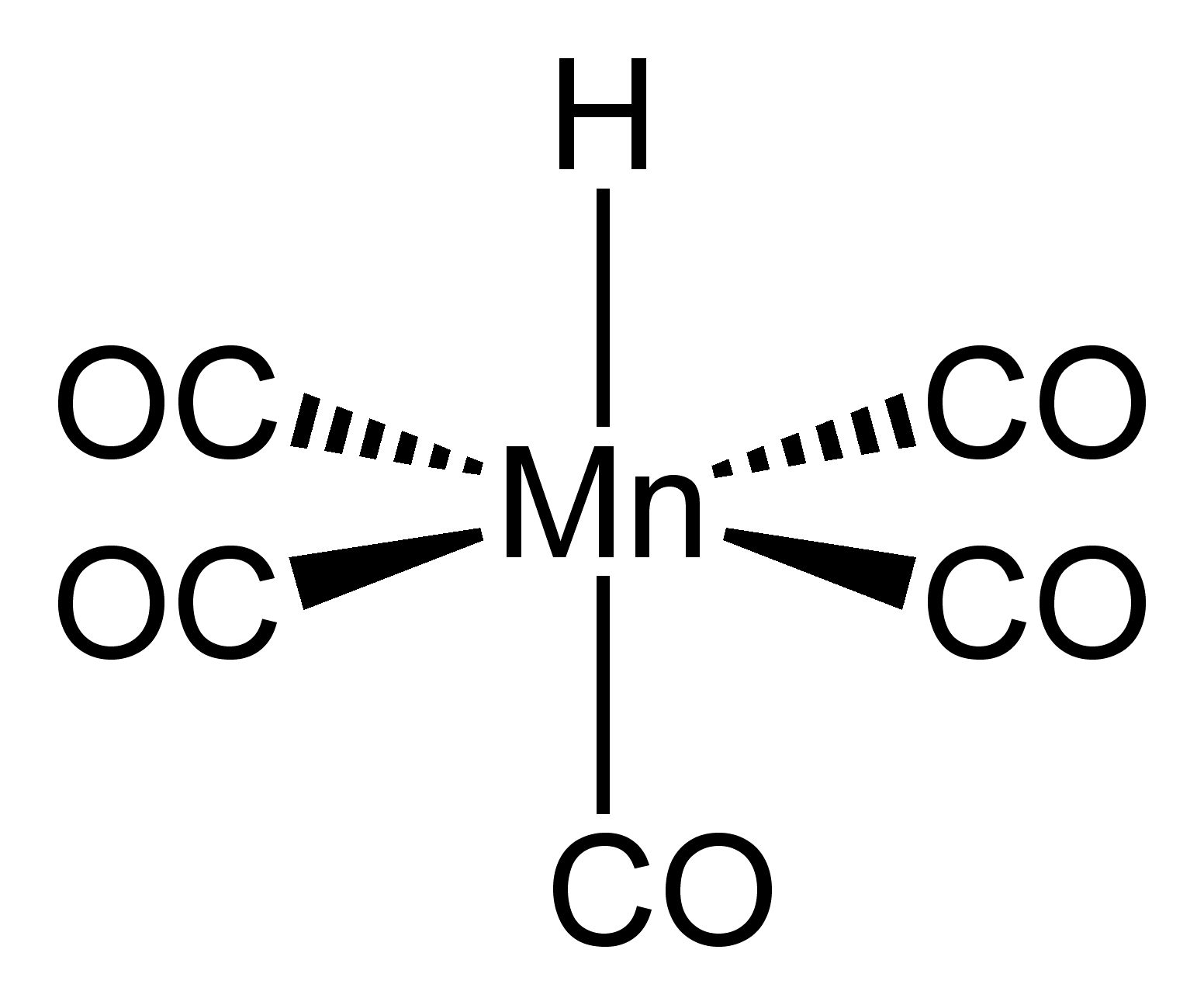
- Pentacarbonylhydridomanganese

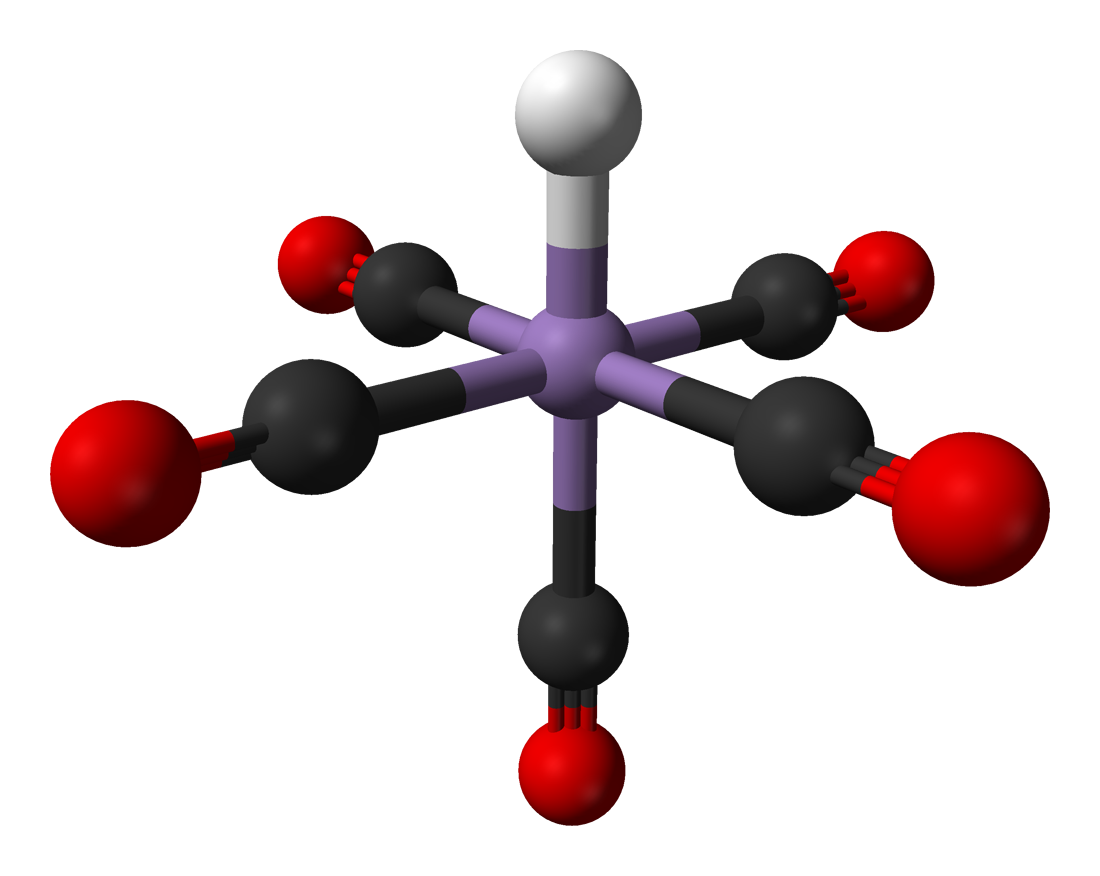

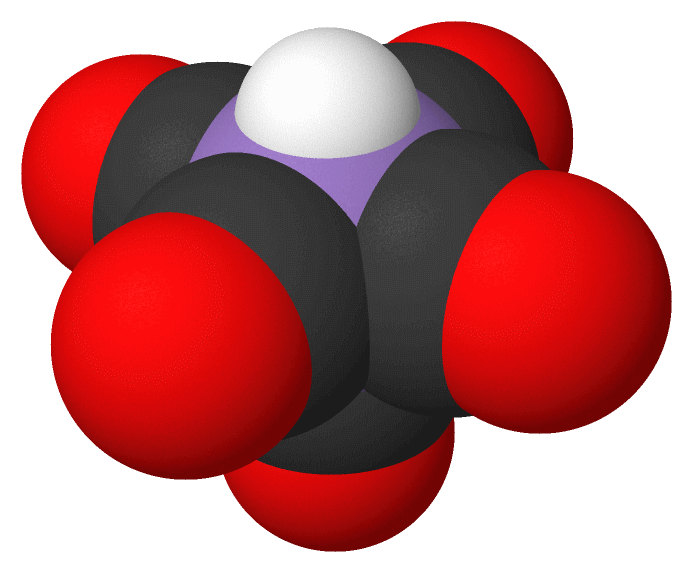

Names
- IUPAC name Pentacarbonylhydridomanganese
- Other names Hydrogen pentacarbonylmanganate(−I) (7CI); Manganese, pentacarbonylhydro- (8CI); Hydridomanganese pentacarbonyl; Hydridopentacarbonylmanganese; Manganese pentacarbonyl hydride; Pentacarbonylhydromanganese; Pentacarbonylmanganese hydride

Identifiers
CAS Number	16972-33-1
3D model (JSmol)	Interactive image
ChemSpider	25945809
PubChem CID	139143359
- InChI: InChI=1S/5CO.Mn.H/c5*1-2;; Key: SKOPWNLHPUYPLV-UHFFFAOYSA-N
- SMILES: O=C=[MnH](=C=O)(=C=O)(=C=O)=C=O

Properties
Chemical formula	HMn(CO)_{5}
Molar mass	195.99799 g/mol
Appearance	colorless liquid
Acidity (pK_{a})	7.1
- Except where otherwise noted, data are given for materials in their standard state (at 25 °C [77 °F], 100 kPa). verify (what is ?) Infobox references

Pentacarbonylhydridomanganese is an organometallic compound with formula HMn(CO)_{5}. This compound is one of the most stable "first-row" transition metal hydrides.

== Preparation ==
It was first reported in 1931. Of the several ways to produce this compound, is the protonation of the pentacarbonyl manganate anion. The latter is formed from reduction of dimanganese decacarbonyl, e.g., with superhydride:

2 LiHB(C_{2}H_{5})_{3} + Mn_{2}(CO)_{10} → 2 LiMn(CO)_{5} + H_{2} + 2 B(C_{2}H_{5})_{3}
Li[Mn(CO)_{5}] + CF_{3}SO_{3}H → HMn(CO)_{5} + CF_{3}SO_{3}Li

Salts of [Mn(CO)_{5}]^{−} can be isolated as crystalline PPN^{+} (μ-nitrido—bis-(triphenylphosphorus)) salt, which is smoothly protonated by CF_{3}SO_{3}H.

PPN[Mn(CO)_{5}] + CF_{3}SO_{3}H → HMn(CO)_{5} + PPN^{+}CF_{3}SO^{−}_{3}

This compound can also be formed by the hydrolysis of pentacarbonyl(trimethylsilyl)manganese:

(CO)_{5}MnSiMe_{3} + H_{2}O → HMn(CO)_{5} + Me_{3}SiOH (Me = CH_{3})

== Structure and properties ==
The structure of HMn(CO)_{5} has been studied by many methods including X-ray diffraction, neutron diffraction, and electron diffraction. HMn(CO)_{5} can be related to the structure of a hexacarbonyl complex such as Mn(CO)^{+}_{6}, and therefore has similar properties. The compound has octahedral symmetry, its molecular point group is C_{4v} and the H-Mn bond length is 1.44 ± 0.03 Å. Gas phase electron diffraction analysis confirms these conclusions.

== Main reactions ==
The pK_{a} of HMn(CO)_{5} in water is 7.1. It is thus comparable to hydrogen sulfide, a common inorganic acid, in its acidity.

A common reaction involving HMn(CO)_{5} is substitution of the CO ligands by organophosphines, as occurs both thermally and photochemically. In this way the many derivatives form of the type HMn(CO)_{5-x}(PR_{3})_{x}. (R here need not be a purely hydrocarbon component; it may, for instance, be OEt, where Et = ethyl group.)

HMn(CO)_{5} can be used to reduce olefins and other organic compounds, as well as metal halides.

It can be methylated with diazomethane.

HMn(CO)_{5} + CH_{2}N_{2} → Mn(CO)_{5}CH_{3} + N_{2}
