= Solute carrier family 30 member 10 =

Protein found in humans

SLC30A10

Identifiers
- Aliases: SLC30A10, HMDPC, ZNT10, ZNT8, ZRC1, ZnT-10, solute carrier family 30 member 10, HMNDYT1
- External IDs: OMIM: 611146; MGI: 2685058; GeneCards: SLC30A10

Gene location (Human)
Chr.	Chromosome 1 (human)
Band	1q41	Start	219,685,427 bp
Band	1q41	End	219,959,018 bp

Gene location (Mouse)
Chr.	Chromosome 1 (mouse)
Band	1|1 H5	Start	185,187,045 bp
Band	1|1 H5	End	185,200,959 bp
RNA expression pattern
Bgee	Human / Mouse (ortholog); Top expressed in: jejunal mucosa; right lobe of liver; mucosa of transverse colon; endothelial cell; duodenum; Epithelium of choroid plexus; retinal pigment epithelium; testicle; buccal mucosa cell; mucosa of sigmoid colon / Top expressed in: duodenum; lumbar subsegment of spinal cord; ventricular zone; liver; left lobe of liver; epithelium of small intestine; ganglionic eminence; embryo; jejunum; yolk sac; More reference expression data
BioGPS	n/a
Gene ontology
Molecular function	cation transmembrane transporter activity; zinc ion transmembrane transporter activity; protein binding; manganese ion transmembrane transporter activity
Cellular component	integral component of membrane; membrane; endosome; early endosome; Golgi apparatus; recycling endosome; plasma membrane
Biological process	regulation of sequestering of zinc ion; manganese ion transport; response to zinc ion; cation transport; zinc ion transport; ion transport; transmembrane transport; zinc ion transmembrane transport; epidermal growth factor receptor signaling pathway; negative regulation of neuron apoptotic process; positive regulation of ERK1 and ERK2 cascade; manganese ion transmembrane transport; regulation of zinc ion transport; negative regulation of reactive oxygen species biosynthetic process; cellular response to angiotensin; regulation of cellular response to manganese ion; negative regulation of cellular senescence; cation transmembrane transport
Sources:Amigo / QuickGO
Orthologs
Databases	NCBI: entry; OMA: entry
Species	Human	Mouse
Entrez	55532	226781
Ensembl	ENSG00000196660	ENSMUSG00000026614
UniProt	Q6XR72	Q3UVU3
RefSeq (mRNA)	NM_001004433; NM_018713; NM_001376929	NM_001033286
RefSeq (protein)	NP_061183; NP_001363858; NP_061183.2	NP_001028458
Location (UCSC)	Chr 1: 219.69 – 219.96 Mb	Chr 1: 185.19 – 185.2 Mb
PubMed search
- Wikidata
View/Edit Human	View/Edit Mouse

Solute carrier family 30 member 10 is a protein that in humans is encoded by the SLC30A10 gene.

== Function ==
This gene is highly expressed in the liver and is inducible by manganese. Its protein product appears to be critical in maintaining manganese levels, and has higher specificity for manganese than zinc. Loss of function mutations appear to result in a pleomorphic phenotype, including dystonia and adult-onset parkinsonism. Alternatively spliced transcript variants have been observed for this gene. [provided by RefSeq, Mar 2012].
