= Mangani (disambiguation) =

Mangani is a fictional species of great apes from the Tarzan novels by Edgar Rice Burroughs, and the invented language used by these apes.

Mangani may also refer to:

- Lameck Mangani, a Zambian politician representing Chipata Central in 2006
- Thomas Mangani (born 1987), a French soccer player
- Mangani Lal Mandal, an Indian politician
- The Mangani Festival in Karaikal district, Puducherry, India

== See also ==
- Mangan (disambiguation)
- Magnani
- Mangini
- Mangano
- Manganese
- Manganite (disambiguation)
