= The Aspern Papers =

1888 novella by Henry James

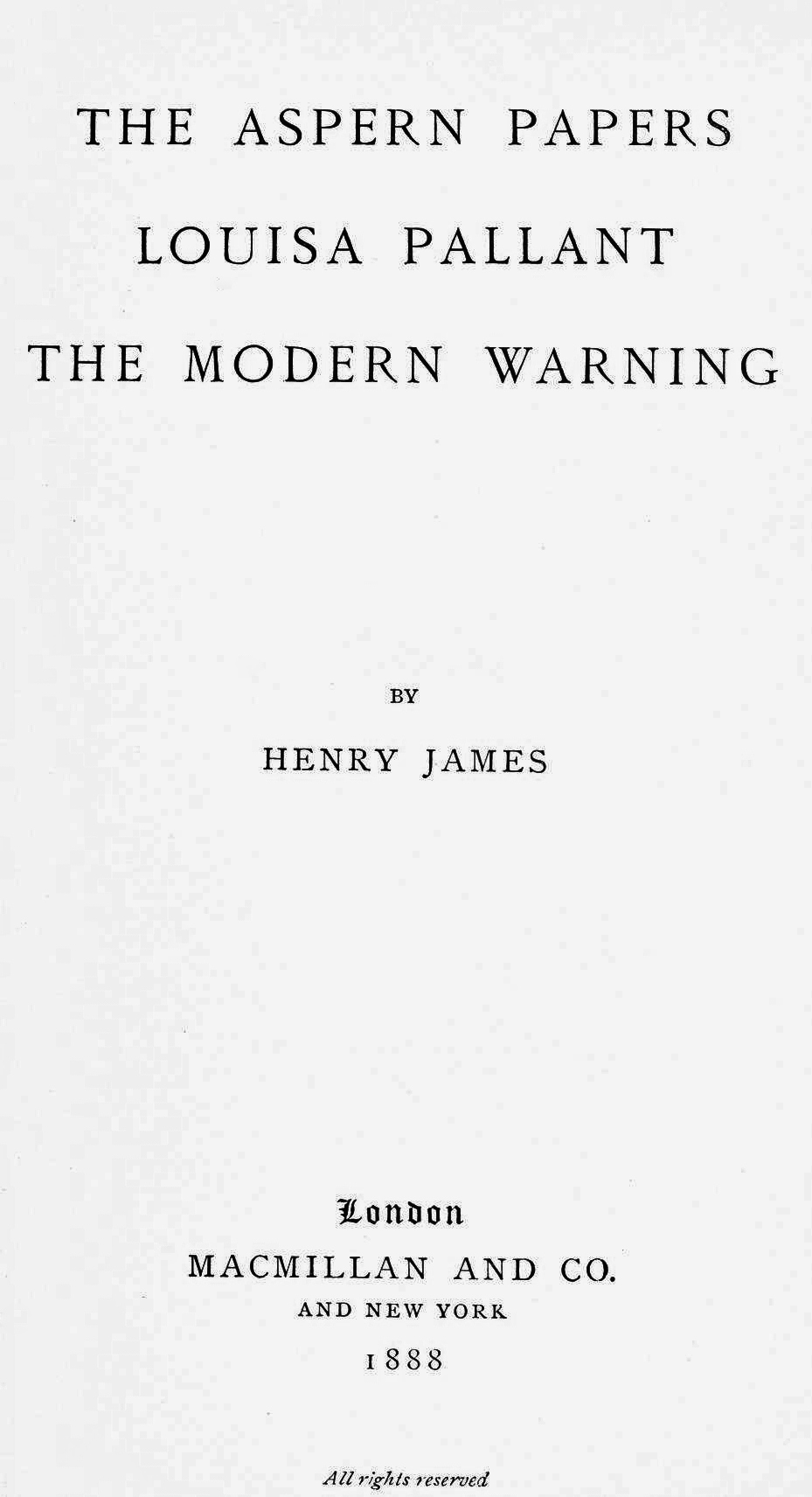
- First edition title page
- Author: Henry James
- Language: English
- Genre: Novella
- Publisher: Macmillan and Co., London, New York City
- Publication date: London: 5 October 1888; New York City: 12 November 1888
- Publication place: United Kingdom, United States
- Media type: Print
- Pages: London: volume one, 239; volume two, 258; New York City: 290; Both editions also included the stories Louisa Pallant and The Modern Warning
- Dewey Decimal: 813.4

The Aspern Papers is a novella by American writer Henry James, originally published in The Atlantic Monthly in 1888, with its first book publication later in the same year. One of James's best-known and most acclaimed longer tales, The Aspern Papers is based on the letters Percy Bysshe Shelley wrote to Mary Shelley's stepsister, Claire Clairmont, who saved them until she died. Set in Venice, The Aspern Papers demonstrates James's ability to generate suspense while never neglecting the development of his characters.

== Plot summary ==
A nameless narrator goes to Venice to find Juliana Bordereau, an old lover of Jeffrey Aspern, a famous and now dead American poet. The narrator presents himself to the old woman as a prospective lodger and is prepared to court her niece Miss Tita (renamed Miss Tina in later editions), a plain, somewhat naïve spinster, in hopes of getting a look at some of Aspern's letters and other papers kept by Juliana. Miss Tita had denied the existence of any such papers in a letter to the narrator and his publishing partner, but he believes she was dissembling on instructions from Juliana. The narrator eventually discloses his intentions to Miss Tita, who promises to help him.

Later, Juliana offers to sell a portrait miniature of Aspern to the narrator for an exorbitant price. She doesn't mention Jeffrey Aspern's name, but the narrator still believes she possesses some of his letters. When the old woman falls ill, the narrator ventures into her room and gets caught by Juliana as he is about to rifle her desk for the letters. Juliana calls the narrator a "publishing scoundrel" and collapses. The narrator flees, and when he returns some days later, he discovers that Juliana has died. Miss Tita hints that he can have the Aspern letters if he marries her.

Again, the narrator flees. At first he feels he can never accept the proposal, but gradually he begins to change his mind. When he returns to see Miss Tita, she bids him farewell and tells him that she has burned all the letters one by one. The narrator never sees the precious papers, but he does send Miss Tita some money for the miniature portrait of Aspern which she gave him.

== Major themes ==
James (a very private man) examines the conflicts involved when a biographer seeks to pry into the intimate life of his subject. James paints the nameless narrator of The Aspern Papers as, in Juliana's words, a "publishing scoundrel", but also generates sympathy for the narrator as he tries to work the papers loose from Juliana, who is presented as greedy, domineering and unappealing.

The story unwinds into the double climax of Juliana's discovery of the narrator about to break into her desk, and Miss Tita's revelation that she has destroyed the papers. Miss Tita is ashamed of her marriage proposal to the narrator, but James implies that she does exactly the right thing by depriving him of the papers. In a way, she develops into the true heroine of the story.

== Critical evaluation ==
James thought so highly of this story that he put it first in volume 12 of The New York Edition, ahead of even The Turn of the Screw. Critics have almost unanimously agreed with him about the tale's superb quality. Leon Edel wrote, "The story moves with the rhythmic pace and tension of a mystery story; and the double climax ... gives this tale ... high drama".

== Text versions ==
The Aspern Papers was first published in three parts in March–May 1888 editions of The Atlantic Monthly, and published in book form in London and New York later in the same year. It was subsequently revised, with the addition of a Preface and changes including "Miss Tita" being renamed to "Miss Tina", for the 1908 New York Edition.

== Film, play and opera versions ==
- The 1947 film The Lost Moment was loosely based on The Aspern Papers. It starred Susan Hayward as Miss Tina and Robert Cummings as the narrator.
- In 1959, The Aspern Papers was adapted for the stage by Michael Redgrave and successfully produced at the Queen's Theatre in London's West End, with Redgrave and Flora Robson in the lead roles. A Broadway production followed in 1962 starring Maurice Evans and Wendy Hiller. The play has been revived a number of times since.
- In 1974, London Weekend Television (ITV) made Affairs of the Heart, a collection of seven dramatizations of stories by Henry James. The third episode, "Miss Tita", was a fairly close adaptation of The Aspern Papers. It starred Margaret Tyzack as Miss Tita, Beatrix Lehmann as Juliana Bordereau, and John Carson as Charles Faversham, the narrator.
- In 1984 the play was produced at the Theatre Royal, Haymarket, London. The cast included Vanessa Redgrave playing Miss Tina, the lead, and Wendy Hiller playing Juliana. Christopher Reeve played the male lead, Henry Jarvis. Vanessa Redgrave was given the Olivier Award for Best Actress in a revival.
- The 1985 film Aspern, directed by Eduardo de Gregorio, starring Jean Sorel, Bulle Ogier and Alida Valli
- In 1988 the Dallas Opera presented the world premiere of Dominick Argento's opera The Aspern Papers. In the same year, and on the same day (11 November) an opera by Philip Hagemann, also based on the novel, and with the same title, was premiered at Northwestern University.
- The 1991 film Els Papers d'Aspern, directed by Jordi Cadena, starring Sílvia Munt
- In 2002, Les Papiers d'Aspern, scenic adaptation by Jean Pavans, staged by Jacques Lassalle, produced by the Comédie-Française.
- On 26 April 2010, BBC Radio 4 began broadcasting an abridged audio version of The Aspern Papers, in their Book at Bedtime slot. It was read by Samuel West.
- The 2010 film The Aspern Papers, directed by Mariana Hellmund, starring Judith Roberts and Brooke Smith, Felix d'Alviella, Joan Juliet Buck, Lourdes Brito and, Marvin Huise.
- Another film titled The Aspern Papers was released in 2018. It is directed by Julien Landais, and stars Jonathan Rhys Meyers, Vanessa Redgrave, Joely Richardson, Poppy Delevingne, Jon Kortajarena and Barbara Meier.

== Sources ==
- Tales of Henry James: The Texts of the Tales, the Author on His Craft, Criticism edited by Christof Wegelin and Henry Wonham (New York: W.W. Norton & Company, 2003) ISBN 0-393-97710-2
- The Tales of Henry James by Edward Wagenknecht (New York: Frederick Ungar Publishing Co., 1984) ISBN 0-8044-2957-X
