= Julien Landais =

French filmmaker, actor, and model (born 1981)

- Landais in 2018
- Born: Pierre-Alexandre Thomas Julien Landais; August 6, 1981 (age 44); Angers, France
- Occupations: Filmmaker; actor
- Height: 182 cm (6 ft 0 in)

Pierre-Alexandre Thomas Julien Landais (born August 6, 1981) is a French film director, actor, producer and model, best known for The Aspern Papers, his feature film adaptation of Henry James' novel starring Jonathan Rhys-Meyers, Vanessa Redgrave and Joely Richardson.

== Directing ==
He has previously directed short films, fashion films, commercials and music videos.

He has created his own production company Princeps Films and has completed filming in Venice his first feature film, The Aspern Papers (2018), which he also produced with Summerstorm Entertainment and Cohen Media Group, based on Jean Pavans' scenic adaptation of Henry James' novel, which Academy Award-winning screenwriter James Ivory is executive producing, and starring Jonathan Rhys-Meyers, Academy Award-winning actress Vanessa Redgrave, Joely Richardson, Jon Kortajarena, Poppy Delevingne, Morgane Polanski, Nicolas Hau and Barbara Meier. The 75th Venice International Film Festival held a special screening of The Aspern Papers on the occasion of the Golden Lion for Lifetime Achievement award of the 2018 Venice Film Festival to Vanessa Redgrave.

== Acting ==
In 2010, he played the part of Christophe, alongside Emmanuelle Béart in Nous Trois, directed by Renaud Bertrand. In 2011, he appeared as Maiwenn’s brother in her critically acclaimed film Polisse. He also played the leads in the short films he directed, Shakki (2012), a sci-fi short story opposite Daphne Guinness, Masque d’Or (2014) broadcast by Le Figaro, featuring a Samurai katana fight shot on location in the Grand Trianon of the Chateau de Versailles, inspired by Japanese Manga The Rose of Versailles and Saint Seiya, where he plays the villain Anthony opposite actress Marie de Villepin. He also played in Inside Me (2014) with Nora Arnezeder and Camellias (2015) opposite French actresses Marie-Anne Chazel and Andrea Ferreol.

== Modelling ==
Julien was the face of Jean-Paul Gaultier SS2002 campaign.
