= Barbara Meier =

German fashion model and actress (born 1986)

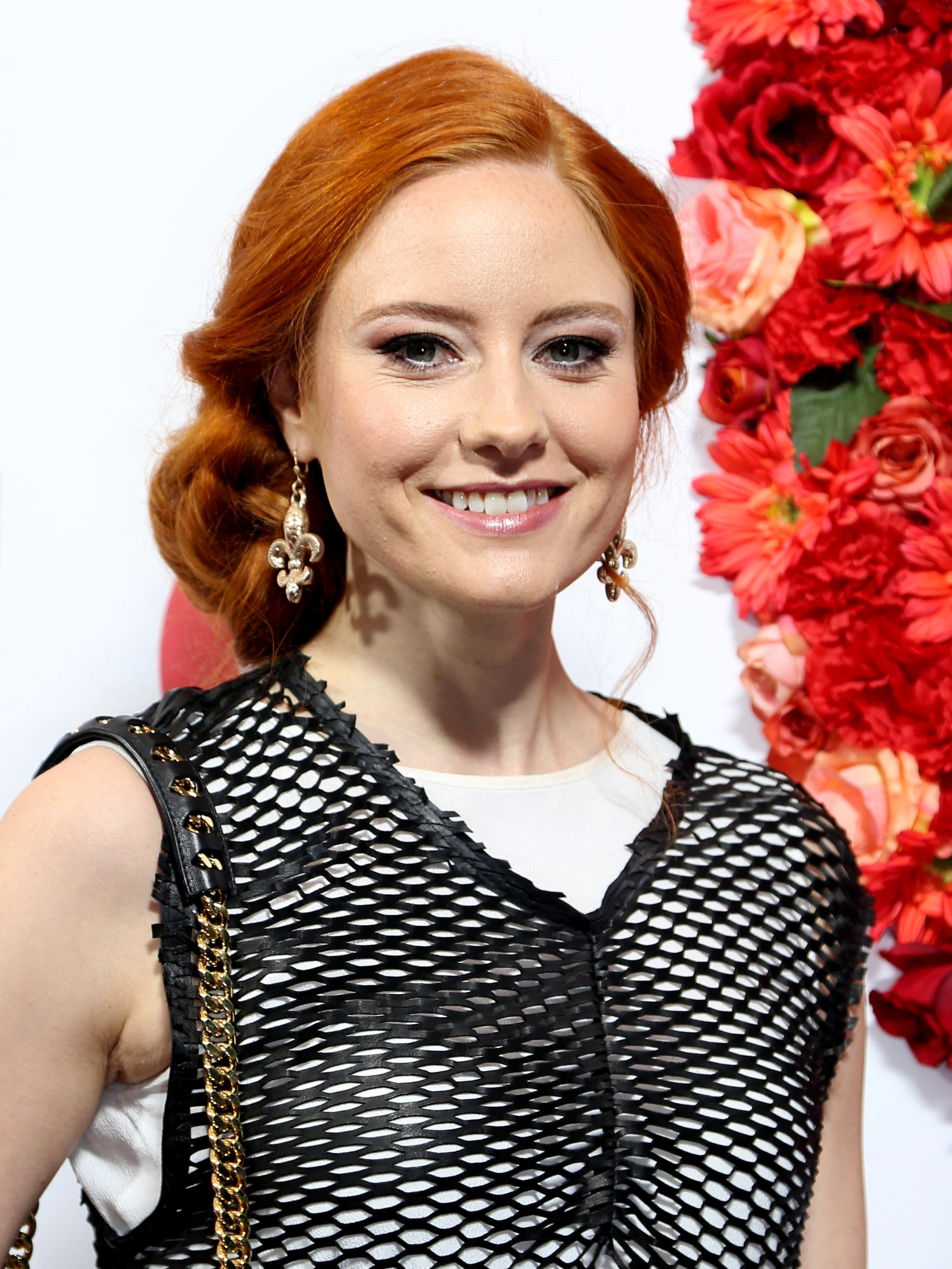
- Meier in 2017
- Born: 25 July 1986 (age 40); Amberg, Bavaria, West Germany
- Occupations: Model, actress
- Years active: 2007–present
- Spouse: Klemens Hallmann (m. 2019)
- Children: 2
- Modeling information
- Height: 1.74 m (5 ft 8 1/2 in)
- Hair color: Red
- Eye color: Blue
- Agency: IMG Models; Major Model Management
- Website: barbarameier.com

Barbara Meier (born 25 July 1986) is a German fashion model and actress. She is best known as the winner of the second season of Germany's Next Topmodel.

== Early life ==
Born in the small Bavarian town of Amberg, Meier did not originally aspire to a career in modeling. Instead, after graduating from school, she enrolled at the Fachhochschule Regensburg in order to study mathematics.

== Career ==
=== Germany's next Topmodel ===
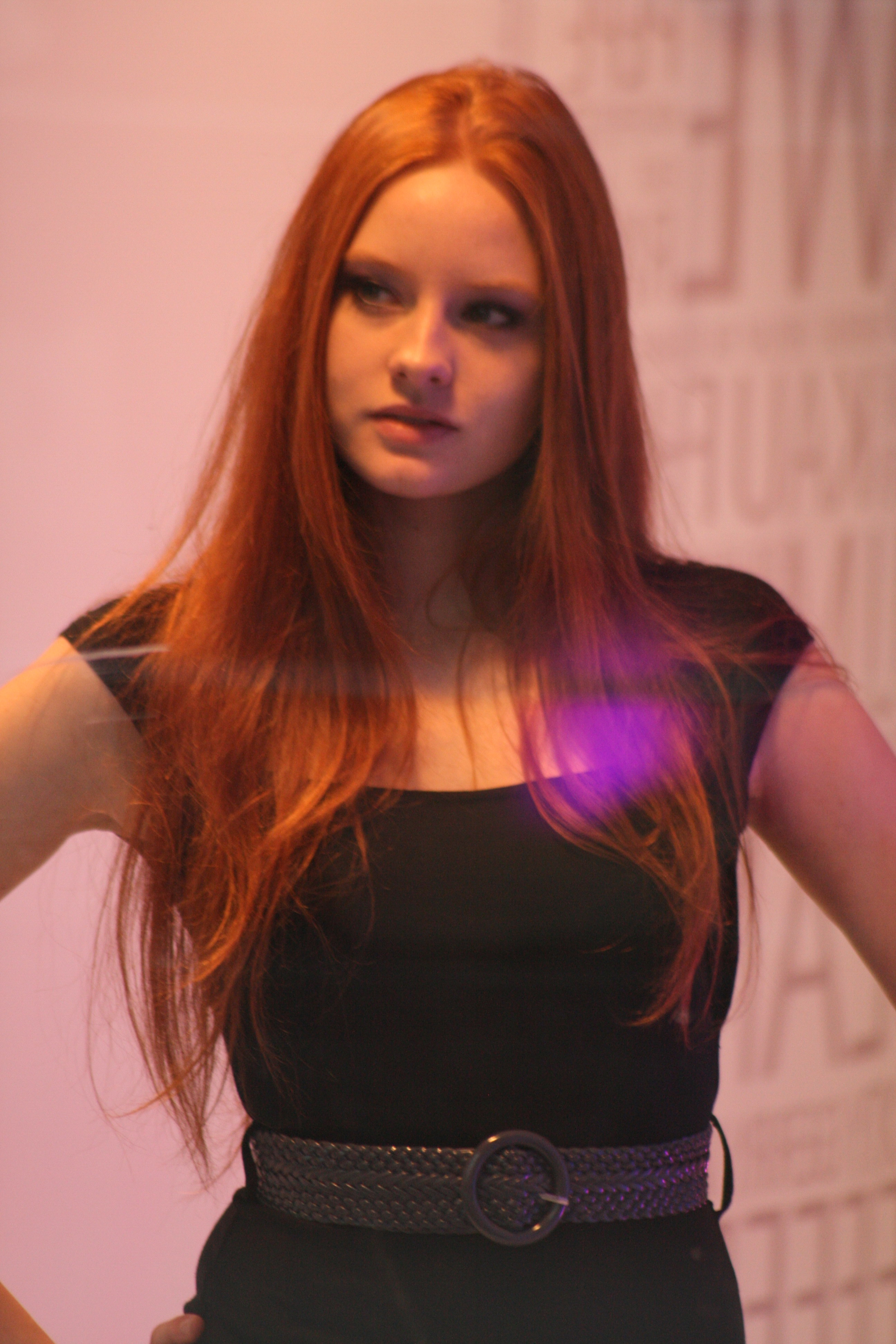
Meier in 2007

During her studies, Meier was approached by a model scout in a shopping center in Regensburg who invited her to the casting of the TV show Germany's Next Topmodel. In the course of the show, she had to face a series of challenges in order to outrival her contestants. Even before the end of the show, one of these minor competitions had her win a leading role alongside Heidi Klum in a nationwide TV commercial for McDonald's. Meier did not have any modeling experience before that but she was able to prevail against 16,421 competitors and became the winner of the season on 24 May 2007. The prize included a contract with the modelling agency IMG Models in Paris, an appearance on the cover of the German edition of Cosmopolitan in August 2007, and a contract as the face of the next advertising campaign for the clothing company C&A.

=== Magazines/Editorials/Cover ===
Meier was featured in editorials of many international magazines such as Vogue Taiwan, Grazia, InStyle, Elle, Madame Figaro, L'Officiel, etc. and appeared on the cover of over 15 German and international magazines such as Cosmopolitan, Icon, Style International, Tango, She, etc.

=== Advertising ===
She was the face of many advertising campaigns for the brands Pantene, C&A, Disneyland Resort Paris, Yogurette, Müller Milk and McDonald's and also internationally for Maybelline, Fabi, Borsalino, Save the Queen, Colin's Jeans, C'est comme Ca, Charactere, Miss Poem and many more. Since January 2016, she has been promoting the cosmetics manufacturer Schaebens. She is also the German advertising face of the American shoe brand Skechers and the pulse watch manufacturer Polar.

=== Catwalk ===
Since the beginning of her career, Meier has been on the catwalk for national as well as international brands. At the beginning of 2011 she ran for the fifth time for various designers at Fashion Week Berlin. In addition to shows in Los Angeles, New York, Paris and Bangkok Meier participated in the Fashion Week Paris in the spring of 2010, where she was booked by the designer Wolfgang Joop for the prêt-à-porter show of his brand Wunderkind.

=== Acting ===
In 2010, Meier was invited to a film casting for the ProSieben mystery thriller Schreie der Vergessenen. She had no acting experience at that time yet and got the role of the deaf medium Morgana. After the broadcast of the film in autumn 2011, she was taken under contract by the Berlin acting agency Fitz & Skoglund.

In summer of 2011, Meier completed a basic education at the New York Film Academy and since then she has taken private acting lessons with various coaches in Germany and the United States. In addition to small roles in TV films, Meier played in main roles of various ZDF crime series, short films, working with Christiane Hörbiger. In 2012, she played one of the leading roles in the short film Wiegenlied (Director: Selcuk Cara, Germany, 2012), which had its premiere in 2012 under the international title Lullaby in the Student Etudes Panorama section at the film festival Plus Camerimage in Bydgoszcz, Poland.

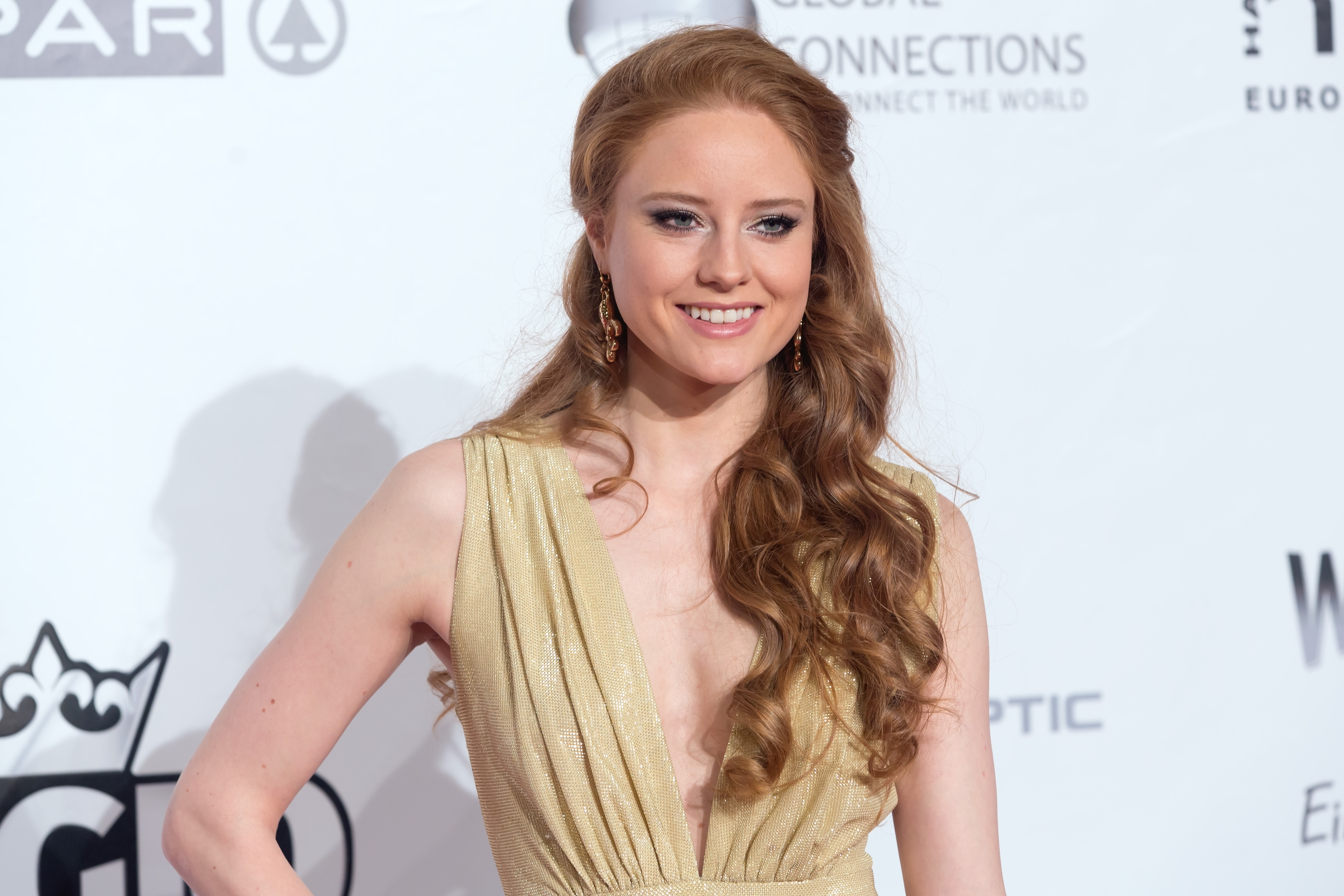
Meier in 2015

In August 2017, Meier shot her first movie, The Aspern Papers, a period drama directed by Julien Landais and based on Henry James's novel. She played alongside Jonathan Rhys Meyers, Morgane Polanski, and Poppy Delevingne.

=== Book author ===
In December 2015, Meier's book Dein Weg zum Glücksgewicht was published by Dorling Kindersley. She describes the work as an "anti-diet book" and above all wants to motivate women and make them feel better in their bodies.

== Charity ==
In 2008, she was an ambassador for the Year of Mathematics, to which she was appointed by the Federal Ministry of Education and Research. In 2012, she was one of the advertising ambassadors of the Deutsches Museum in Munich. She is the ambassador of the campaign "Inform" of the Federal Ministry of Food and Agriculture, which is promoting exercise and healthy nutrition of the population. Since 2015, she has been an ambassador of the WWF for the project "ghost nets", which informs the public about the environmental impact and dangers of the fishing nets floating in the sea.

Since 2017, Barbara Meier has been the ambassador for the Federal Ministry for Economic Cooperation and Development for fair and environmentally friendly fashion. Meier is committed to bringing sustainable textiles from the niche to a broader market.

== Personal life ==
Meier married Austrian entrepreneur and investor Klemens Hallmann in 2019. Their first daughter was born in 2020 and a second daughter in 2022.

== Agencies ==
- 301 Model Management, Istanbul
- Fashion Cult Model Management, Athens
- Major Model Management, Munich
- Major Model Management, New York
- Major Model Management, Paris
- Major Model Management, Milan
- Yuli Models, Tel Aviv

== Filmography ==
- 2010: (Ver-)Passt (TV trailer)
- 2011: Gute Reise (short)
- 2011: Schreie der Vergessenen (TV film)
- 2012: München schaut hin (Socialspot)
- 2012: Der Staatsanwalt – Schlangengrube (TV series)
- 2012: Der Alte – Blinder Hass (TV series)
- 2012: Wiegenlied (short)
- 2013: Notruf Hafenkante – Das Geheimnis der Braut (TV series)
- 2013: Hattinger und die kalte Hand – Ein Chimseekrimi (TV film)
- 2013: Küstenwache – Die Hand des Teufels (TV series)
- 2013: Schon wieder Henriette (TV film)
- 2013: Christine. Perfekt war gestern! – Ein Ex zum Knutschen (TV series)
- 2013: Apothekerin (short)
- 2014: Strangers (short)
- 2014: Sechs auf einen Streich – Siebenschön (TV film)
- 2015: Stuttgart Homicide – Tödliche Tage (TV series)
- 2015: Schwägereltern (TV film)
- 2015: The Pasta Detectives 2
- 2015: Heiraten ist nichts für Feiglinge (TV film)
- 2015: SOKO München (TV series)
- 2016: SOKO Wismar (TV series)
- 2017: Mord in bester Gesellschaft (TV series)
- 2018: Oskar — Gehen, wenns am schönsten ist
- 2018: The Aspern Papers
- 2019: Reiterhof Wildenstein – Die Pferdeflüsterin (TV Film)
- 2020: Endless
- 2021: Army of Thieves
- 2022: Wolke unterm Dach
- 2022: Die Geschichte der Menschheit - leicht gekürzt
- 2022: Der Onkel - The Hawk
- 2022: Schächten
- 2024: Dahoam is Dahoam (TV series, 3 episodes)

Preceded by Lena Gercke	Germany's Next Topmodel winner Cycle 2 (2007)	Succeeded by Jennifer Hof
