= Jean Pavans =

French writer and translator (born 1949)

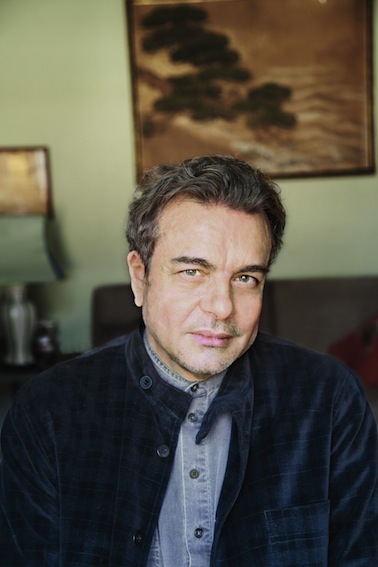
Jean Pavans in Paris, 2015

Jean Pavans is a French writer and translator, born in Tunis to Bernard Pavans de Ceccatty (1925–1984) and Ginette Fréah (1924–2015) on September 20, 1949. The writer René de Ceccatty is his younger brother.

== Career ==
His first books were published in the early 1980s by Éditions de la Différence. He then began his translations of Henry James, the main part of which being The Complete Tales, in four volumes, the first appearing in 1990, and the last one in 2009.

For various publishers, he translated other English-language classics by Edith Wharton, Virginia Woolf, Gertrude Stein, Harold Pinter, Percy Bysshe Shelley and Lord Byron.

His first play adapted from Henry James, Retour à Florence, was performed in 1985 at the Théâtre du Rond-Point in Paris.

His French adaptation of The Aspern Papers was staged in 2002 by Jacques Lassalle and produced by the Comédie-Française^{,}.

His translation of Harold Pinter's Celebration was staged in 2005 by Roger Planchon at the Théâtre du Rond-Point in Paris.

Published in 2003, his translation of Harold Pinter's The Proust Screenplay was broadcast in 2012 by France Culture with the actors of the Comédie-Française^{,}.

He wrote the libretto of La Bête dans la jungle based on Henry James' 1903 novella The Beast in the Jungle, an opera by French composer Arnaud Petit, premiered in 2011 at the Forum du Blanc-Mesnil, with the orchestra Les Siècles conducted by François-Xavier Roth.

In 2015, he worked with film director Julien Landais on a script in English based on his scenic adaptation of Les Papiers d'Aspern.

The film, The Aspern Papers, was shot in Venice in July 2017, starring Vanessa Redgrave, Joely Richardson and Jonathan Rhys-Meyers.

An expanded version of La Bête dans la jungle premiered in April 2023 at the Cologne Opera in a staging by Frederic Wake-Walker, with Emily Hindrichs and Miljenko Turk as May Bartram and John Marcher, and the Gürzenich Orchester conducted by François-Xavier Roth.

== Distinctions ==
- Chevalier de l'Ordre des Arts et Lettres, 1999

== Publications ==
=== Éditions de la Différence ===
- Lazare définitif, récit, 1980.
- Sauna, pastiches, 1980; réédition, Minos, 2006.
- Ruptures d'innocence, roman, 1982.
- La Griselda, nouvelles, 1986.
- Retour à Florence, théâtre d'après Henry James, 1986.
- Le Sceau brisé, esquisse jamesienne, 1988.
- Le Théâtre des sentiments, roman, 1991.
- Persée, légende dramatique, 2006.
- Heures jamesiennes, essai, 2008.
- Le Regard du dandy, nouvelles, 2009.

=== Other publishers ===
- La Traversée américaine, essai, Payot, 1999.
- Marlene Dietrich, biographie, Gallimard, 2007.
- Le Musée intérieur de Henry James, essai, avec iconographie, Le Seuil, 2016.
- Le Christ selon Berlioz, essai, avec anthologie, Bayard, 2018.
- Proust, Vermeer, Rembrandt, essai, Arléa, 2018.
- Le Scénario Baudelaire, essai, Le Seuil, 2020.
- Les Démons et les Rêves de Josef von Sternberg, essai, avec illustrations, Le Seuil, 2024.

== Translations ==
=== Henry James ===
- Retour à Florence, nouvelles, La Différence, 1983; réédition 10/18 n^{o} 2128, 1990.
- La Source sacrée, roman, La Différence, 1984; réédition, 10/18 n^{o} 2195, 1991; réédition révisée, Folio n^{o} 4190, 2005.
- Heures italiennes, essais, La Différence, 1985; réédition, Minos, 2006.
- Esquisses parisiennes, chroniques, La Différence, 1988; réédition, Minos, 2006.
- Nouvelles complètes, tome 1 (1864–1875), La Différence, 1990. deuxième édition 2010.
- Nouvelles complètes, tome 2 (1876–1888), La Différence, 1992. deuxième édition 2012.
- La Scène américaine, essais, La Différence, 1993, réédition, Minos, 2008.
- Le Tollé, roman, Aubier, 1996; réédition GF n^{o} 1150, 2001.
- Pauvre Richard, nouvelle, Mille et une nuits, Petite collection n^{o} 103, 1996
- Les Journaux, nouvelle, Grasset, Cahiers rouges n^{o} 255,1997.
- La Tour d'ivoire, roman, Payot, 1998; réédition, Rivages/Poche n^{o} 355, 2001.
- Le Tour d'écrou, nouvelle, EJL, Librio n^{o} 200, 1997; réédition, GF bilingue n^{o} 1034, 1999; réédition, GF Étonnants classiques n^{o} 236, 2006
- Daisy Miller, nouvelle, GF bilingue n^{o} 1146, 2001.
- Les Papiers d'Aspern, nouvelle, Mille et une nuits, Petite collection n^{o} 243, 1999; réédition, GF bilingue n^{o} 1159, 2002.
- La Bête dans la jungle et Le Motif dans le tapis, nouvelles, GF bilingue n^{o} 1181, 2004.
- George Sand, essais, préface de Diane de Margerie, Mercure de France, 2004.
- Nouvelles complètes, tome 3 (1888–1896), La Différence, 2008.
- Nouvelles complètes, tome 4 (1896–1910), La Différence, 2009.Prix Halpérine-Kaminsky Consécration 2009.
- Sur Robert Browning, essais, Le Bruit du temps, 2009.
- Les Ambassadeurs, roman, Le Bruit du temps, 2010.
- La Situation littéraire actuelle en France, essais, Le Seuil, 2010.
- La Maîtresse de M. Briseux, et sept autres nouvelles, Intégrale thématique des Nouvelles, volume 1, La Différence, coll. Minos, 2010.
- Les Papiers d'Aspern, et sept autres nouvelles, Intégrale thématique des Nouvelles, volume 2, La Différence, coll. Minos, 2010.
- Le Siège de Londres, et cinq autres nouvelles, Intégrale thématique des Nouvelles, volume 3, La Différence, coll. Minos, 2011.
- Une tournée de visite, et neuf autres nouvelles, Intégrale thématique des Nouvelles, volume 4, La Différence, coll. Minos, 2011.
- Le Point de vue, et sept autres nouvelles, Intégrale thématique des Nouvelles, volume 5, La Différence, coll. Minos, 2012.
- Le Motif dans le tapis, et onze autres nouvelles, Intégrale thématique des Nouvelles, volume 6, La Différence, coll. Minos, 2012.
- Heures anglaises, essais, Le Seuil, 2012.
- La Coupe d'or, roman, Le Seuil, 2013; réédition, Points Signatures, 2016.
- Daisy Miller, et neuf autres nouvelles, Intégrale thématique des Nouvelles, volume 7, La Différence, coll. Minos, 2016.
- Les Papiers d'Aspern, avec préface et adaptation théâtrale, Points Signatures, 2018.
- Voyages d'une vie, chroniques, Bouquins Laffont, 2020.
- Les Ailes de la colombe, roman, Le Bruit du Temps, 2020.
- La Bête dans la jungle suivi de L'Autel des morts, nouvelles, Points Signatures, 2023.
- Le Tour d'écrou suivie de L'Élève, nouvelles, Points Signatures, 2024.
- Mal d'Italie, correspondence avec William James 1869-70, Arfuyen, 2026.

=== Other writers ===
- Edith Wharton
  - Les Chemins parcourus, autobiographie, Flammarion, 1995; réédition, 10/18 n^{o} 3324, 2001; nouvelle édition augmentée, Flammarion, 2021. Prix Maurice Coindreau 1996.
  - Sur les rives de l'Hudson, roman, Flammarion, 1996; réédition, J'ai lu n^{o} 4932, 1999.
  - Les dieux arrivent, roman, Flammarion, 1999; réédition, J'ai lu n^{o} 6075, 2000.
  - Les Mœurs françaises et comment les comprendre, essai, Payot, 1999.
  - Les New-Yorkaises, roman, Flammarion, 2000; réédition, J'ai lu n^{o} 5905, 2001.
  - Une affaire de charme, nouvelles, Flammarion, 2002; réédition, J'ai lu n^{o} 6921, 2004.
  - Libre et légère (suivi de Expiation), roman, Flammarion, 2003; réédition, J'ai lu n^{o} 8030, 2006.
  - Un fils sur le front, roman, Flammarion, 2004.
  - Preuve d'amour, nouvelles, Flammarion, 2005.
  - Les Règles de la fiction, essai, Viviane Hamy, 2006.
  - La France en automobile, essai, préface de Julian Barnes, Mercure de France, 2015; réédition, Folio n° 6300, 2017.
  - Les Amours d'Odon et Fulvia, roman, Flammarion, 2016.
  - Terminus et autres poèmes intimes, Arfuyen, 2024.
- Gertrude Stein
  - Flirter au Bon Marché, anthologie, Phébus, 2008.
  - Henry James, précédé de William Shakespeare par Henry James, essais, Phébus, 2008.
- Harold Pinter
  - Poésie, in Autres Voix, textes, Buchet-Chastel, 2001; repris dans Un verre à minuit, L'Arche, 2010.
  - Le Scénario Proust, Gallimard, 2003.
  - Célébration & La Chambre, théâtre, Gallimard, 2003
  - La Guerre, poésie, Gallimard, 2003.
  - Art, Vérité et Politique, discours de réception du Nobel 2005, Gallimard, 2006.
- Percy Bysshe Shelley
  - La Révolte de l'Islam, édition bilingue, préface de Judith Brouste, Poésie/Gallimard, 2016.
- Lord Byron
  - Le Corsaire et autres poèmes orientaux, édition bilingue, avec préface, Poésie/Gallimard, 2019.
  - Le pèlerinage de Childe Harold, édition bilingue, préface de Franck Delorieux, Manifeste!, 2022.
- W. E. B. Du Bois
  - Pénombre de l'aube, autobiographie, avec préface et notes, Vendémiaire, 2020.
- Walt Whitman
  - L'ivrognerie de Franklin Evans, roman, avec préface et notes, Corti, 2022.
- Rupert Brooke
  - Lettres d'Amérique, précédées de Rupert Brooke par Henry James, avec préface et notes, Manifeste!, 2022.
- Ralph Waldo Emerson
  - L'éthique littéraire, cinq conférences, précédées d' Emerson par Henry James, avec préface et notes, Les Belles Lettres, 2022.
- Algernon Charles Swinburne
  - Atalante à Calydon, préface de Marc Porée, Manifeste!, 2024.
