= Die Geschichte der Menschheit - leicht gekürzt =

Die Geschichte der Menschheit – leicht gekürzt
- Theatrical release poster
- Directed by: Erik Haffner
- Written by: Chris Geletneky; Claudius Pläging; Erik Haffner; Roland Slawik
- Cinematography: Gerhard Schirlo
- Edited by: Jochen Donauer
- Production companies: Pantaleon Films; Gerda Film; Warner Bros. Film Productions Germany; Brainpool; WS Filmproduktion
- Distributed by: Warner Bros. Pictures
- Release date: 16 June 2022
- Countries: Germany; Switzerland
- Language: German
- Box office: $2.3 million

Die Geschichte der Menschheit – leicht gekürzt is a 2022 German-language comedy film directed by Erik Haffner, based on the German TV series Sketch History.

The film was released on 16 June 2022 by Warner Bros. Pictures.

== Cast ==
- Christoph Maria Herbst as Dr. Gerhard Friedle
- Bela B as Joseph-Ignace Guillotine
- Heino Ferch as Kapitän Smith
- Max Giermann as Jesus / Kinski
- Jeanette Hain as Greta Thunberg
- Hannes Jaenicke as Kaleun Prien
- Rick Kavanian as Mentu Hotep / Rufus Eisenpilz / Patros Papadopulos
- Carolin Kebekus as Karola
- Matthias Matschke as Platon / Björn / Bürgermeister Mellies / Pontius Pilatus / Elliot Ness / General Olbricht
- Barbara Meier as Tizia Medici
