= The Aspern Papers (film) =

- Directed by: Julien Landais
- Screenplay by: Julien Landais, Jean Pavans, Hannah Bhuiya
- Based on: The Aspern Papers by Henry James
- Produced by: Gabriela Bacher, Julien Landais, Prince Charles-Henri de Lobkowicz
- Starring: Jonathan Rhys-Meyers; Joely Richardson; Vanessa Redgrave
- Cinematography: Philippe Guilbert
- Edited by: Hansjörg Weissbrich
- Music by: Vincent Carlo
- Distributed by: Cohen Media (US, Canada)
- Release date: 30 August 2018 (Venice Film Festival)
- Running time: 90 minutes
- Countries: United Kingdom; Germany
- Language: English

The Aspern Papers is a 2018 period drama, co-written, co-produced and directed by Julien Landais, based on Jean Pavans' scenic adaptation of Henry James' eponymous 1888 novel. The film stars Jonathan Rhys-Meyers, Joely Richardson and Vanessa Redgrave; Academy Award-winner James Ivory acting as executive producer.

== Plot ==
Set in Venice in the late 19th century and based on Henry James' novella of the same name,The Aspern Papers is a story of obsession, grandeur lost, and dreams of Byronesque adventures.

Morton Vint, an ambitious editor, is fascinated by the Romantic poet Jeffrey Aspern and the poet's brief but passionate life. Having travelled from America to Venice, Vint is determined to obtain the letters Aspern wrote to his beautiful lover and muse, Juliana Bordereau.

Now the ferocious guardian of their secrets, Juliana lives in a grand but rather dilapidated Venetian palazzo with her niece, Miss Tina. Posing as prospective lodger, Morton charms Miss Tina, who leads a very quiet life dominated by her aunt. At first hiding his real intentions, he eventually confesses his true passion to Miss Tina. She reluctantly agrees to help him.

But Juliana is suspicious of Morton, and a confrontation between the two of them shows how frail the strong-willed old lady actually is. Morton flees the house. When he returns, he learns of Juliana's death. Miss Tina is now willing to share the infamous letters with him, but the condition she sets is one that Morton finds he cannot fulfill, after all.

Deeply ashamed by the rejection, Tina overcomes her embarrassment and hurt and finds an unknown inner strength. When Morton reconsiders his decision, she confronts him with a revelation.

== Cast ==
- Jonathan Rhys-Meyers as Morton Vint
- Joely Richardson as Miss Tina, Juliana Bordereau's niece
- Vanessa Redgrave as Juliana Bordereau
- Lois Robbins as Mrs Prest, Morton's confidente
- Jon Kortajarena as Romantic Poet Jeffrey Aspern
- Poppy Delevingne as Signora Colonna
- Morgane Polanski as Valentina Prest
- Barbara Meier as Emily, Valentina's friend
- Alice Aufray as young Juliana
- Nicolas Hau as the second Romantic Poet

== Release ==
The Aspern Papers was first screened at the 2018 Venice Film Festival. It was selected as the opening film with world premiere at 49th International Film Festival in Goa.

== Reception ==
The film holds a 19% rating on Rotten Tomatoes from a total of 26 reviews, indicating strong dislike. Several critics lamented the film's sluggishness; John DeFore of The Hollywood Reporter called the film "more lifeless than its namesake's long-dead body," while David Lewis of the San Francisco Chronicle labeled it "a Merchant-Ivory film - on Quaaludes," giving it 1 out of 4 stars. Many critics considered the performance from Jonathan Rhys-Meyers to be one of the picture's worst aspects; writing for Slant Magazine, Keith Watson said:

"Rhys-Meyers is absurdly unconvincing throughout. With his gratingly thin American accent, stilted line readings, and rigid, glowering facial expressions, the actor demonstrates all the range and emotional depth of Derek Zoolander. He evokes none of Vint’s intelligence or passion, rendering him instead a dull, hectoring cipher."
