= Mangana =

Mangana may refer to:

== Europe ==
- Mangana (Constantinople), a quarter of Byzantine-era Constantinople where a palace and two monasteries were located
- Mangana Tower, a tower of unknown origin in Cuenca, Spain
- Mangana, Xanthi, a settlement in Xanthi regional unit, Greece

== Tasmania ==
- Mangana, a Bruny Island ferry
- Truganini (Mangana), a chief of the Bruny Island people
- Mangana, a ship of the Tasmanian Steam Navigation Company
- Mangana, Tasmania, a village, mountain and gold mine in Tasmania, Australia

== See also ==
- Mangan (disambiguation)
