= The Dark Lady of the Sonnets =

1910 short comedy by George Bernard Shaw

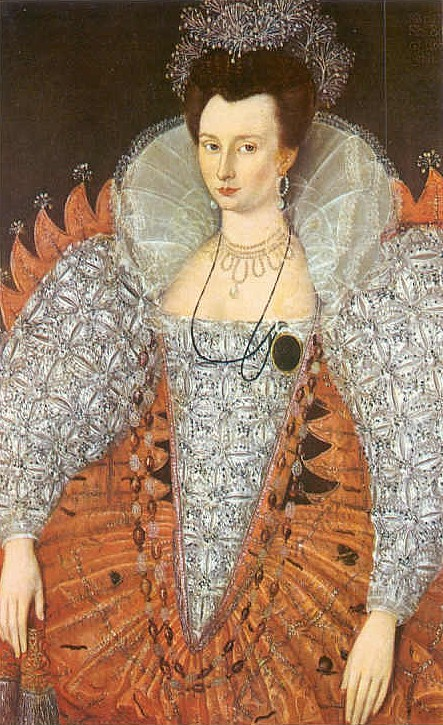
- In his preface Shaw identifies the Dark Lady as Mary Fitton
- Original language: English
- Written by: George Bernard Shaw
- Subject: Shakespeare tries to persuade the queen to create a national theatre
- Genre: Period piece; comedy
- Setting: Sixteenth century: Whitehall Palace, London, England

Premiere
- Date: 24 November 1910
- Place: Haymarket theatre, London

The Dark Lady of the Sonnets is a 1910 short comedy by George Bernard Shaw in which William Shakespeare, intending to meet the "Dark Lady", accidentally encounters Queen Elizabeth I and attempts to persuade her to create a national theatre. The play was written as part of a campaign to create a "Shakespeare National Theatre" by 1916.

== Characters ==
- The Beefeater
- The Man (Shakespeare)
- The Lady (Queen Elizabeth)
- The Dark Lady

== Plot ==
The play is set at "Fin de siècle 15-1600. Midsummer night on the terrace of the Palace at Whitehall, overlooking the Thames. The Palace clock chimes four quarters and strikes eleven."

The Man arrives at Whitehall where he meets a Beefeater guard. He persuades the Beefeater to allow him to stay to meet his girlfriend, a lady of the court, who will be arriving soon for a secret tryst. The Man notes down various interesting phrases used by the Beefeater (all quotations from Shakespeare plays). The Lady arrives, cloaked, but it is not the woman he is expecting. The Man immediately falls for her. While also noting down her own interesting expressions in his notebook, he tells her how beautiful and desirable she is. The Dark Lady arrives, and is shocked to see her lover attempting to seduce another woman. She tells The Lady not to trust The Man, as he is a mere actor. She then recognises that The Lady is Queen Elizabeth. The Man reveals that he is William Shakespeare. The Queen demands that he should apologise to her, but Shakespeare insists that his family is more respectable than hers, and that she only has her job by accident of birth. The Dark Lady is shocked by Shakespeare's frankness, but the queen forgives him. Shakespeare complains that his worst plays, As You Like It and Much Ado About Nothing, are the most popular, but is most proud of the ones with intelligent female characters, such as All's Well that End's Well. If the queen would establish a National Theatre, he could create more of the kind of plays he wants to, rather than those that please the public. The queen says she'll look into it, but does not think the idea will please her Treasurer. She thinks it will probably be another 300 years before the idea will gain widespread support. She upbraids the Beefeater for allowing Shakespeare into the palace grounds, and tells him to make sure that Shakespeare leaves.

== Background ==
In 1902, a London Shakespeare League was founded to develop a Shakespeare National Theatre, aspiring to achieve this by the impending tricentenary in 1916 of Shakespeare's death. Shaw's play was written for the campaign. Two years later in 1913 it purchased land for a theatre in Bloomsbury. The plan for a theatre by 1916 eventually failed because of the outbreak of World War I.

The play refers to the "dark lady", who is the addressee of Shakespeare's sonnets 127 to 152, so-called because her hair and her eyes are said to be of a dark colour. In the sonnets, the poet is apparently involved in a sexual relationship with the Lady, but it is implied that she is unfaithful to him, perhaps with the "Fair Youth", the young man who is the addressee of most of the other sonnets. Many attempts have been made to identify the "Dark Lady" and "Fair Youth" with historical personalities. At the time Shaw's play was written, a favoured candidate for the Lady was Mary Fitton (this identification had been made by Shaw's friend Thomas Tyler but later dropped) and for the Youth was William Herbert, 3rd Earl of Pembroke, who is known to have had an affair with Fitton. In the play the Lady is referred to by name as "Mary", and there is a reference to Pembroke having met the Lady the previous night ("Last night he stood here on your errand, and in your shoes").

== Preface ==
In the programme for the 1910 Haymarket production, Shaw wrote a satirical preface under the title "A Dressing Room Secret", in the form of a story set in a dressing room, in which a group of party-goers are dressing as Shakespeare characters for a "Shakespeare Ball". A bust of Shakespeare in the room talks to the characters he has created, telling them that he thinks Iago and Lady Macbeth are unconvincing characters, and that many of his creations came about by accident.

== Opera ==
The play was made into an opera by Philip Hagemann (2008).
