= Roman Fever =

1934 short story by Edith Wharton

- Short story by Edith Wharton
- Country: United States
- Language: English
- Genre: short story

Publication
- Published in: Liberty
- Publication type: periodical
- Publisher: Bernarr Macfadden, Liberty Publishing Corporation
- Media type: print
- Publication date: November 10, 1934

Chronology
The Private Life of Helen Hayes	Whom Will the Republicans Nominate for President?

"Roman Fever" is a short story by American writer Edith Wharton. It was first published in Liberty magazine on November 10, 1934. A revised and expanded version of the story was published in Wharton's 1936 short story collection The World Over.

== Plot summary ==
Grace Ansley and Alida Slade are middle-aged American women visiting Rome with their daughters, Barbara Ansley and Jenny Slade. The women live in Manhattan, New York, and have been friends since girlhood. A youthful and romantic rivalry led Mrs. Slade to nurture feelings of jealousy and hatred against Mrs. Ansley. For her part, Mrs. Ansley looks down on Mrs. Slade, who she feels has led "a sad life."

In the opening pages of the story, the two women compare their daughters and reflect on each other's lives. Eventually, Alida reveals a secret about a letter written to Grace on a visit to Rome twenty-five years ago. The letter was purportedly from Alida's fiancé, Delphin, inviting Grace to a rendezvous at the Colosseum. In fact, Alida forged the letter in an attempt to send Grace on a fruitless outing and expose her "delicate throat" to the "deathly cold." Mrs. Ansley is upset at this revelation, but explains that she was not left alone at the Colosseum; she responded to the letter, and Delphin arrived to meet her. Mrs. Ansley then says that she feels sorry for Mrs. Slade, repeating her earlier thoughts. Mrs. Slade states that, while she was "beaten there," Mrs. Ansley ought not to feel sorry for her, because she "had [Delphin] for twenty-five years" while Mrs. Ansley had "nothing but that one letter that he didn't write." Mrs. Ansley responds, in the last sentence of the story, "I had Barbara," implying that Barbara is Delphin's daughter.

== Setting ==
The story takes place in the afternoon through sunset, in the city of Rome, at a restaurant overlooking the Forum. Two wealthy, middle-aged, widowed women are visiting Rome with their two unmarried daughters. The setting illustrates the power and class from which the women hail, but the Old Rome context, such as the Colosseum, insinuates Roman Empire-style intrigue. The movement from afternoon to sunset indicates the devastation that both women will receive as the story progresses. The story's flashbacks take place in both Rome and New York City.

== Analysis ==
Knitting is one several motifs in "Roman Fever." It is introduced through Barbara's mocking suggestion that she and Jenny "leave the young things," an ironic reference to their mothers, "to their knitting." Jenny objects that the women are "not actually knitting" (Wharton's emphasis). To which Barbara replies, "Well, I mean figuratively."

Critic Kathleen Wheeler argues that the search for truth is one of the story's primary themes. And while many readers are initially attracted to the story's surprise ending, Wheeler suggests that the story has levels of complexity that are often overlooked on first reading. "[T]he truth, like the past," Wheeler writes, "is shrouded in mystery." Rather than focusing on the answers provided by Grace's and Alida's revelations in the story's concluding pages, Wheeler foregrounds the way in which "Wharton forces upon the reader numerous unanswerable questions."

== Characters ==
Alida Slade: Middle-aged widow of Delphin Slade. Because so much of her identity is wrapped up in her relationship to her husband, "it was a big drop from being the wife of Delphin Slade to being his widow."

Delphin Slade: "[A] famous corporation lawyer", and the late husband of Alida. Delphin's "big coup in Wall Street" allowed him to move his family from East 73rd Street to the more fashionable "upper Park Avenue."

Grace Ansley: Middle-aged widow of well-to-do Horace Ansley. She is "smaller and paler" than Mrs. Slade and "evidently far less sure than her companion of herself and of her rights in the world."

Horace Ansley: Late husband of Grace. He and his wife are variously described as "Museum specimens of old New York. Good-looking, irreproachable, exemplary."

Barbara Ansley: Daughter of Grace Ansley. In the opening paragraphs of the story, we hear her "mocking voice in the stairway" as she and Jenny Slade depart. While the girls' parents contend that they're both "angels," Mrs. Slade suggests that Grace's daughter has "rainbow wings."

Jenny Slade: Daughter of Alida Slade. Younger than Barbara, she is "that rare accident, an extremely pretty girl who somehow made youth and prettiness seem as safe as their absence". Mrs. Slade wishes "that Jenny would fall in love – with the wrong man, even; that she might have to be watched, out-manoeuvred, rescued. And instead, it was Jenny who watched her mother, kept her out of draughts, made sure that she had taken her tonic...."

Headwaiter: Supervising waiter at the terrace restaurant overlooking the Roman Forum, the Colosseum, and other ancient ruins. After receiving a gratuity from Alida Slade, he invites Alida and Grace to remain at the restaurant to enjoy the view. Notably, the headwaiter has no dialogue in the story—his ideas are communicated secondhand by way of the narrator.

Son of Alida Slade: Child who "inherited his father's gifts," but "died suddenly in boyhood."

Harriet: Deceased great-aunt of Grace. According to a story handed down, Harriet and her sister loved the same man. To get rid of her sister, Harriet supposedly tricked her into exposing herself to Roman fever. She later died of the disease.

== Themes ==
Power struggle for those in the upper classes: Engaged to Delphin Slade, Alida suspects that Grace might try to steal him from her. Alida tries to remove Grace from the picture by forging Delphin's signature on a letter inviting the latter to a nighttime rendezvous at the Colosseum. The plan backfires for Alida because her eventual husband actually meets with Grace. Alida still marries her beau, but it seems the soon-to-be Mrs. Ansley actually bears Mr. Slade's daughter, Barbara.

Betrayal and deception: As a young woman, Mrs. Slade used subterfuge and machination in order to improve her marriage prospects.

Grudges: In their middle age, Mrs. Slade and Mrs. Ansley introduce decades-old surprises.

== Representation of female relationships ==
Grace feels sorry for Alida, while Alida envies Grace. The women "visualize each other, each through the wrong end of her little telescope." Only through the sharing of their two perspectives do they begin to see a fuller picture of their past.

== Bibliography ==
Almost universally praised by critics, "Roman Fever" earned a place in An Edith Wharton Treasury (1950) and The Best Short Stories of Edith Wharton (1958). It is the title story of Roman Fever and Other Stories, a collection of Wharton's writing originally published in 1964 and still in print. A sign of the enduring interest in the story, Penguin UK published a new edition of Wharton's stories titled Roman Fever in July 2026. One of Wharton's most anthologized stories, "Roman Fever" is the subject of numerous critical studies as outlined in the partial bibliography provided below.

Barrett, Dorothea. "Lions, Christians, and Gladiators: Colosseum Imagery in Henry James's Daisy Miller and Edith Wharton's 'Roman Fever.'" Remember Henry James Conference, March 2014, Florence, Italy. Conference Presentation.

Bauer, Dale M. "'Roman Fever': A Rune of History." Edith Wharton's Brave New Politics. Madison: U of Wisconsin P, 1994. 145–164.

Berkove, Lawrence I. "'Roman Fever': A Mortal Malady." The CEA Critic 56.2 (Winter 1994): 56–60.

Bode, Rita, and Sirpa Salenius. "Students Abroad – In the Classroom: A Transatlantic Assignment on Edith Wharton's 'Roman Fever.'" Teaching Edith Wharton's Major Novels and Short Fiction. Ed. Ferdâ Asya. Bloomsburg: Palgrave, 2021. 279–290.

Bowlby, Rachel. "Edith Wharton's 'Roman Fever.'" University College London, London, England, 12 April 2005. Lecture.

---. "'I had Barbara': Women's Ties and Wharton's 'Roman Fever.'" Differences: A Journal of Feminist Cultural Studies 17.3 (Fall 2006): 37–51.

Clavaron, Yves. "Rome: Où S'Attrapent la Maladie de L'Amour et la Maladie de la Mort." Poétique des Lieux. Edited by Pascale Auraix-Jonchière and Alain Montandon. Clermont-Ferrand, France: Presses Universitaires Blaise Pascal, 2004. 77–83.

Comins, Barbara. "'Outrageous Trap': Envy and Jealousy in Wharton's 'Roman Fever' and Fitzgerald's 'Bernice Bobs Her Hair.'" Edith Wharton Review 17.1 (Spring 2001): 9–12.

Edwards, Laura. "'I Had Barbara': Wharton's Portrayal of the Maternal Declaration." The Maternal Question: Motherhood in Edith Wharton. A thesis submitted to the Graduate Faculty of North Carolina State University in partial fulfillment of the requirements for the Degree of Master of Arts. 2005. 23–37. http://repository.lib.ncsu.edu/ir/bitstream/1840.16/191/1/etd.pdf

Ellison, Kristie L., "Make War, Not Love: Exploring Female Equality in Edith Wharton's 'Roman Fever.'" Edith Wharton in Washington, Conference Abstract. Edith Wharton Review 32.1–2 (2016): 111.

Formichella Elsden, Annamaria "Roman Fever Revisited." Roman Fever: Domesticity and Nationalism in Nineteenth-Century American Women's Writing. Columbus: Ohio State U P, 2004. 119–132.

Gawthrop, Betty. "Roman Fever." Masterplots: Short Story Series. Ed. Frank Magill. Vol. 5. Pasadena: Salem Press, 1986. 1974–1977.

Gill, Linda L. "Structuralism and Edith Wharton's 'Roman Fever.'" Short Stories in the Classroom. Eds. Carole Hamilton and Peter Kratzke. Urbana: National Council of Teachers of English, 1999. 85–93.

Griffin, Larry D. "Doubles and Doubling in Edith Wharton's 'Roman Fever.'" Texas Wesleyan University, Fort Worth, Texas, February 2, 1990. Lecture.

Hefko, Daniel. "Adapting 'Roman Fever.'" Edith Wharton in Washington, Conference Abstract. Edith Wharton Review 32.1–2 (2016): 115–116.

Hemm, Ashley, "Countering Traditional Mating Strategies: Female Serial Monogamy in Edith Wharton's 'The Other Two' and 'Roman Fever.'" Edith Wharton in Washington, Conference Abstract. Edith Wharton Review 32.1–2 (2016): 116.

Herman, David. "Narration and Knowledge in Edith Wharton's 'Roman Fever.'" Invited presentation for the University of Virginia's Department of English; April 2003.

Hoeller, Hildegard. "The Illegitimate Excess of Motherhood in 'The Old Maid,' 'Her Son,' and 'Roman Fever.'" Edith Wharton's Dialogue with Realism and Sentimental Fiction. Gainesville: University Press of Florida, 2000. 140–172.

Klevay, Robert. "Edith Wharton's 'Roman Fever,' Or the Revenge of Daisy Miller." Critical Insights: Edith Wharton. Ed. Myrto Drizou. Hackensack: Salem Press, 2017. 171–185.

Koprince, Susan. "Edith Wharton, Henry James, and 'Roman Fever.'" Journal of the Short Story in English (Autumn 1995): 21–31.

Kornetta, Reiner. "Roman Fever." Das Korsett im Kopf: Ehe und Ökonomie in den Kurzgeschichten Edith Whartons. Frankfurt: Peter Lang, 1995. 163–168.

Lewis, R. W. B. "Introduction." The Collected Short Stories of Edith Wharton. Vol. 1. New York: Charles Scribner's Sons, 1968. vii–xxv.

Macheski, Cecilia. "Visualizing Material Culture in Ethan Frome and 'Roman Fever.'" Presentation at the Edith Wharton and History Conference. June 27, 2008. Pittsfield, Mass.

Mizener, Arthur. "Roman Fever." A Handbook of Analyses, Questions, and a Discussion of Technique for Use with Modern Short Stories: The Uses of Imagination. 4th ed. New York: W. W. Norton, 1979. 71–77.

Mortimer, Armine Kotin. "Romantic Fever: The Second Story as Illegitimate Daughter in Wharton's 'Roman Fever.'" Narrative 6.2 (May 1998): 188–198.

Osborne, Kristen, and A. Boghani. Roman Fever and Other Stories (Classic Notes). Lexington: GradeSaver LLC., 2014.

Pennell, Melissa McFarland. "Roman Fever." Student Companion to Edith Wharton. Westport: Greenwood Press, 2003. 51–54.

Petry, Alice Hall. "A Twist of Crimson Silk: Edith Wharton's 'Roman Fever.'" Studies in Short Fiction 24.2 (1987): 163–166.

Phelan, James. "Narrative as Rhetoric and Edith Wharton's 'Roman Fever': Progression, Configuration, and the Ethics of Surprise."The Blackwell Companion to Rhetoric, ed. Wendy Olmstead and Walter Jost. Malden: Blackwell, 2004. 340–354.

Phelan, James. "Progressing toward Surprise: Edith Wharton's 'Roman Fever.'" Experiencing Fiction: Judgments, Progressions, and the Rhetorical Theory of Narrative. Columbus: Ohio State UP, 2007. 95–108.

Price, Alan. "'Stand Up, Mrs. Ansley, Stand Up': Positions of Power in 'Roman Fever.'" Edith Wharton in Florence Conference. June 8, 2012. Conference Presentation.

Rehder, Jessie. "On the Uses of Plot." The Story at Work: An Anthology." Ed. Jessie Rehder. New York: The Odyssey Press, 1963. 151.

Selina, Jamil S. "Wharton's 'Roman Fever.'" The Explicator 65.2 (Winter 2007): 99–101.

Shaffer-Koros, Carole M. "Nietzsche, German Culture and Edith Wharton." Edith Wharton Review 20.2 (Fall 2004): 7–10.

---. "Roman Fever." The Facts on File Companion to the American Short Story. Ed. Abby Werlock. New York: Facts on File, 2000. 370–71.

Salzman, Jack, Pamela Wilkinson, et al. "Slade, Alida." Major Characters in American Fiction. New York: Henry Holt, 1994. 720.

Sapora, Carol. "A Stereopticon View of Edith Wharton's 'Roman Fever.'" NEMLA Conference, 1989. Conference Presentation.

Saunders, Judith P. "The Old Maid and 'Roman Fever': Female Mate Choice and Competition Among Women." Reading Edith Wharton Through a Darwinian Lens: Evolutionary Biological Issues in Her Fiction. Jefferson: McFarland & Company, 2009. 139–166.

Stoner, Ruth. "The Perfect Short Story: How Edith Wharton's 'Roman Fever' Has Crossed the Boundaries of Time." The Short Story in English: Crossing Boundaries. Eds. Gema Castillo García, Rosa Cabellos Castilla, Juan Antonio Sánchez Jiménez, Vincent Carlisle Espinola. Alcalá de Henares: Servicio de Publicaciones de la Universidad de Alcalá, 2006. 920–931.

Sweeney, Susan Elizabeth. "Edith Wharton's Case of Roman Fever." Wretched Exotic: Essays on Edith Wharton in Europe. Ed. Katherine Joslin and Alan Price. New York: Peter Lang, 1993. 313–331.

Tuttleton, James W., Kristin O. Lauer, Margaret P. Murray, eds. "The World Over." Edith Wharton: The Contemporary Reviews. New York: Cambridge UP, 1992. 531–538.

Tyler, Lisa L. "Wandering Women and the Dangers of Contagion in Edith Wharton's 'The Old Maid' and 'Roman Fever." MLA Conference. December 30, 2007. Conference Presentation.

Wankey, Stan. "Wharton Hears a WHO". EastWesterly Review 12 (Summer 2003).

Wheeler, Kathleen. "The Attack on Realism: Edith Wharton's In Morocco and 'Roman Fever.'" "Modernist" Women Writers and Narrative Art. New York: New York UP, 1994. 77–98.

Wright, Sarah Bird. "Roman Fever." Edith Wharton A to Z: The Essential Guide to the Life and Work. New York: Facts on File, 1998. 215.

== Adaptations ==
The earliest known professional adaptation of "Roman Fever" is a 1952 episode of NBC's Goodyear Playhouse. KPFA broadcast a radio adaptation of "Roman Fever" in September 1964, starring Pat Franklin and Shirley Medina, adapted and directed by Erik Bauersfeld. Hugh Leonard's one-act adaptation of "Roman Fever" was first staged in Dublin in 1983. Robert Ward's opera adaptation (with libretto by Roger Brunyate) premiered in 1993 at Duke University. Hungarian composer Gyula Fekete's opera Roman Fever ("with additional lyrics by Lisa Radetski") premiered in 1996 at Budapest's Merlin Theatre. Alan Stringer's "opera in one scene" premiered in 1996 at New York's Manhattan School of Music. Philip Hagemann's 1989 one act opera based on Wharton's story has been performed as recently as 2003 in New York at the Lincoln Center's Clark Studio and in 2024 at the Susie Sainsbury Theatre, Royal Academy of Music, London. On April 9, 2026, Manhattan's Grace Church hosted a "special evening featur[ing] selections from an exhilarating new operatic adaptation of Wharton's iconic short story, 'Roman Fever,' composed by Louis Karchin with a libretto by Joan Ross Sorkin." An extensive accounting of the story's adaptation history can be found by consulting the scholarship of Scott Marshall (1998), Hermione Lee (2008), and Daniel Hefko (2016).

== See also ==
- Daisy Miller by Henry James
