= Looted (film) =

2019 British film

- DVD cover
- Directed by: Rene van Pannevis
- Written by: Rene van Pannevis; Kefi Chadwick
- Produced by: Jennifer Eriksson; Jessie Mangum
- Starring: Charley Palmer Rothwell; Thomas Turgoose; Morgane Polanski; Tom Fisher
- Cinematography: Aadel Nodeh-Farahani
- Music by: Tony Coote; Philip Achille
- Production companies: Silk Screen Pictures; Thought Experiment
- Release dates: November 2019 (PÖFF); 6 November 2020 (United Kingdom)
- Running time: 89 minutes
- Country: United Kingdom
- Language: English

Looted is a 2019 British crime drama film.

It was filmed over 17 days in the Hartlepool and Seaton Carew area of County Durham in mid 2018. It had its premiere in November 2019 at the Tallinn Black Nights Film Festival and went on general release in Britain a year later in November 2020.

Looted was Dutch-born director Rene Pannevis's first feature film and was supported by Film London, BBC Film and BFI.

== Plot ==
Set in a run-down northern port town, Rob is the sole carer of his father, Oswald, a former merchant seaman now bed-ridden with a terminal asbestos-related industrial disease. Oswald thinks that when Rob goes out he is job hunting, when in fact he makes money by stealing and selling on cars. Rob manages to keep his two lives separate until best friend Leo gets him involved in a bigger, riskier carjacking that goes wrong, leading to Rob's arrest. Discovering the truth, Oswald moves into a hospice, his relationship with his son damaged. While Rob's future looks bleak, his friendship with Leo's girlfriend Kasia brings him a sense of hope.

The film drew on writer/director Van Pannevis's own experiences, he growing up with car thieves as friends and cared for his own father as he died from asbestos-related cancer at 58.

== Cast ==
- Charley Palmer Rothwell as Rob
- Thomas Turgoose as Leo
- Morgane Polanski as Kasia
- Tom Fisher as Oswald
- Anders Hayward as JP
- Stephen Uppal as Jamie (Police Officer)

== Release and reception ==
The film was first shown at the November 2019 Tallinn Black Nights Film Festival and went on general released in Britain on 6 November 2020. On release it carried a 15 certificate, as only suitable for those aged 15 and over.

=== Critical response ===
The film received generally favorable reviews, with praise for the quality of acting, social realism and cinematography. On the review aggregator website Rotten Tomatoes, 100% of 11 critics' reviews are positive.

Both Kevin Maher in The Times and Ellen E Jones in The Guardian gave the film 4 out of 5 stars. Maher praises the film's "excellent acting and gritty dose of realism [and] thoroughly removes the kitchen sink from kitchen-sink drama", while Jones calls it an "impressive film" while praising the "excellent" performances.

There were also a number of mixed reviews. Demetrios Matheou in Screen International said the film "offers a poignant character piece about a decent young man in crisis" while "all the main performances are excellent". However "other than some mostly picturesque establishing shots, there's little sense of the town and almost no sign of any people in it. If the environment is one of unemployment, impoverishment and little hope, it needs to be more strongly felt". Stephen Dalton in The Hollywood Reporter notes that while the film represents an "engaging overall package", it "occasionally strains too hard for a poignancy and depth that it cannot deliver [and has a] scrappy plot and dialogue that often feels like badly translated second-language English".

=== Accolades ===
The film was an official selection at the 2019 Tallinn Black Nights Film Festival's First Feature Competition, and was nominated for the Raindance Discovery Award at the British Independent Film Awards 2020.
