= Potassium dimanganate(III) =

Names
- IUPAC name potassium di-µ-oxidotetraoxidodimanganate(6−)

Identifiers
3D model (JSmol)	Interactive image
PubChem CID	139046909
- InChI: InChI=1S/6K.2Mn.6O/q6*+1;2*+3;6*-2 Key: UXOXVZBXGUUTNN-UHFFFAOYSA-N
- SMILES: [K+].[K+].[K+].O=[Mn-3]0(=O)O[Mn-3](O0)(=O)=O.[K+].[K+].[K+]

Properties
Chemical formula	K_{6}Mn_{2}O_{6}
Molar mass	440.46 g mol^{−1}
Appearance	Ruby-red crystals

Structure
Space group	P2_{1}/b (No. 14)
Lattice constant	a = 889(5) pm, b = 677(5) pm, c = 1137(9) pm α = 90°, β = 90°, γ = 132.1°
Coordination geometry	Distorted tetrahedral (Mn^{3+})

Related compounds
Other anions	Potassium hypomanganate Potassium manganate Potassium permanganate
- Except where otherwise noted, data are given for materials in their standard state (at 25 °C [77 °F], 100 kPa). verify (what is ?) Infobox references

Potassium dimanganate(III), K_{6}Mn_{2}O_{6}, is a manganese(III) compound. Unlike lithium and sodium manganites, MMnO_{2}, which are best described as mixed oxides, potassium dimanganite contains discrete Mn_{2}O^{6−}_{6} anions in the solid state. It rapidly hydrolyzes in air.

K_{6}Mn_{2}O_{6} is prepared as ruby-red crystals by the reaction of excess potassium oxide with manganese(II) oxide in a sealed nickel bomb at 610 °C for ten days. The Mn_{2}O^{6−}_{6} anion has an Al_{2}Cl_{6}-type structure.
