= Klemens Hallmann =

Austrian entrepreneur (born 1976)

- Born: 1976 (age 49–50); Vienna, Austria
- Occupations: Founder and CEO of Hallmann Holding, entrepreneur and investor
- Spouse: Barbara Meier (m. 2019)
- Children: 2

Klemens Hallmann (born 1976) is an Austrian entrepreneur and investor. He is the founder and sole owner of Hallmann Corporate Group, one of the larger Austrian companies, specialized in sales, renovation and development of real estate projects, in addition to a wide-ranging portfolio of investments including finance and film production. With a net worth of more than 1.7 billion Euros, Hallmann was ranked number 31 on the 100 wealthiest Austrian list made by the renowned magazine "trend premium" in 2023.

== Life ==
Hallmann comes from a modest background in Vienna. Beginning at an early age, he started his business life working for various computer companies while still attending school. Finishing business college at the age of 17, he started his first business, importing and exporting computer components. Using the profits from this, he was able to make his first investment in real estate in 1996. One year later, he founded Hallmann Real Estate Company, which was the beginning of today's operation, Hallmann Holding International Investment Ltd. This company, of which Hallmann is the sole owner, is one of the largest private real estate development companies in Austria, owning a wide range of residential and commercial properties throughout the country. In addition, Hallmann Holding is a major shareholder in a wide range of other companies operating in areas such as investment banking, health research, film production and lifestyle. Since 2016 the Austrian magazin "trend" ranks Hallmann amongst the 100 wealthiest Austrians. In the following year Hallmann was among the top performers of the year and listed 12 positions higher. In 2018 he was ranked at number 43, in 2019 number 39.

At the end of 2018, Hallmann Holding acquired 100% of the Viennese property developer SÜBA AG, which has been active in affordable residential construction for over 40 years. The core business of the fast-growing SÜBA AG comprises services in the areas of planning, construction and sale of condominiums in Vienna and the surrounding area.

Hallmann is a key shareholder and supervisory board member of the film production company Filmhouse Germany AG along with its subsidiaries, Summerstorm Entertainment and Egolli Tossel Film. Several movies produced by Filmhouse Germany and its subsidiaries, as well as their contributing actors, have received prestigious awards and nominations. In 2010 Helen Mirren and Christopher Plummer were nominated at the 82nd Academy Awards and the 67th Golden Globe Awards for their performance in the movie "The last station". The movie and its contributors were nominated an additional 15 times and received a total of 3 awards. In 2011 the TV miniseries "Carlos" was nominated 36 times and won 17 awards, amongst others at the 68th Golden Globe Award for "Best Miniseries or Motion Picture Made for Television". In 2014 the movie "Rush" was awarded 6 times and nominated 57 times. One of the major nominations was for the 71st Golden Globe Awards in the category "Best Motion Picture – Drama". In total, the movies that were realized by these three production companies, as well as the contributing actors' performances, were nominated over 350 times and won more than 170 international awards in the past decades.

Hallmann is also the founder and sole owner of the film and documentation production company Hallmann Entertainment Company GmbH.

Hallmann married the German model and actress Barbara Meier in Venice in June 2019. They have two daughters.

== Sponsoring and social responsibility ==
Since the 2015/2016 basketball season, Hallmann Holding has been the main and name sponsor of the BC Hallmann Vienna and the Hallmann Dome. With the BC Hallmann Vienna, Hallmann places a special emphasis on youth work. In addition to the professional squad, the Hallmann Dome also coaches youth and school teams. In total, over 500 children and young people learn not only to play basketball, but also important values such as mutual respect, fair play, discipline and team spirit. In Christmas and summer camps, the club organizes a unique sports program, which is even offered free of charge to committed pupils with good grades.

With its Hallmann Holding, Hallmann supports numerous social institutions as well as society-promoting projects: Hallmann Holding has been the main sponsor of the international climate conference Austrian World Summit since 2018. Arnold Schwarzenegger's initiative brings together politicians, companies, representatives of civil society, start-ups, actors from regions and cities as well as experts in order to strengthen partnerships, exchange experiences and ideas and facilitate concrete, sustainable climate protection projects. Since 2019, Hallmann Holding has also been the main sponsor and presenter of the European Culture Prize TAURUS, which is awarded to individuals and institutions with visions and creativity who have successfully rendered outstanding services to cultural life in Europe.

Hallmann Holding also supports many different organizations such as the Austrian Red Cross, the Mirno More peace fleet, Licht ins Dunkel, Mission Hoffnung, the United Global Academy and Ronald McDonald Kinderhilfe.

Hallmann is a patron and collector of modern art and his collection includes works by Andy Warhol, Gerhard Richter, Damien Hirst and Gottfried Helnwein. He also supports national and international upcoming artists.

== Business activities ==
- Hallmann Holding International Investment Gmbh, Founder and CEO
- SAVE REAL ESTATE Vienna GmbH, Founder and CEO
- SÜBA Aktiengesellschaft, sole shareholder and head of the advisory board
- Cyan Digital Security, Key Shareholder
- Finclusion
- Rejuveron
- Lulalend, South Africa-based online lending platform, key shareholder
- JDC Group AG, key shareholder and member of the advisory board
- Hallmann Entertainment Company GmbH, Founder and CEO
- PANTAFLIX AG, key shareholder and member of the advisory board
  - PANTALEON Films
  - PANTAFLIX Pictures
  - PANTAFLIX Technologies
  - March & Friends
  - PantaSounds
- Film House Germany AG, key shareholder and member of the advisory board
  - Summerstorm Entertainment
  - Egoli Tossell New Film GmbH
- 40 additional Real Estate companies

== Further positions ==
- Member of the board of trustees of the European Culture Prize
- Vice-President of the Austrian-United Arab Emirates Society
- Vice President of the Austrian basketball team BC Hallmann Vienna

== Filmography ==
- 2023: DreamScapes (producer)
- 2021: Breathtaking (TV documentary) (producer)
- 2021: Der Onkel – The Hawk (producer)
- 2021: Beer-tastic! 2 – Another round! (TV documentary) (producer)
- 2020: Beer-tastic! 2 – Another round! (TV documentary) (producer)
- 2020: Breathtaking (TV documentary) (producer)
- 2020: Deals and Visions (documentary) (producer)
- 2020: Takeover (executive producer)
- 2020: Endless (executive producer)
- 2020: Resistance (executive producer)
- 2019: N.O.C (executive producer)
- 2019: Auerhaus (executive producer)
- 2019: Dem Horizont so nah (executive producer)
- 2019: The Song of Names(executive producer)
- 2019: Abikalypse (executive producer)
- 2018: The Aspern Papers (executive producer)
- 2018: Beer-tastic! (documentary) (producer)
- 2018: Siberia (executive producer)
- 2016: Deutschland. Made by Germany (executive producer)
- 2016: The Exception (fka "The Kaiser's Last Kiss", executive producer)
- 2015: Frankenstein (producer)
- 2015: I Smile Back (co-producer)
- 2015: 3 Türken und ein Baby (executive producer)
- 2014: Coming In (executive producer)
- 2014: Big Game (associate producer)
- 2014: Hector and the Search for Happiness (film) (Executive Producer)
- 2013: The Devil's Violinist (associate producer)
