= Thomas Law =

British actor (born 1992)

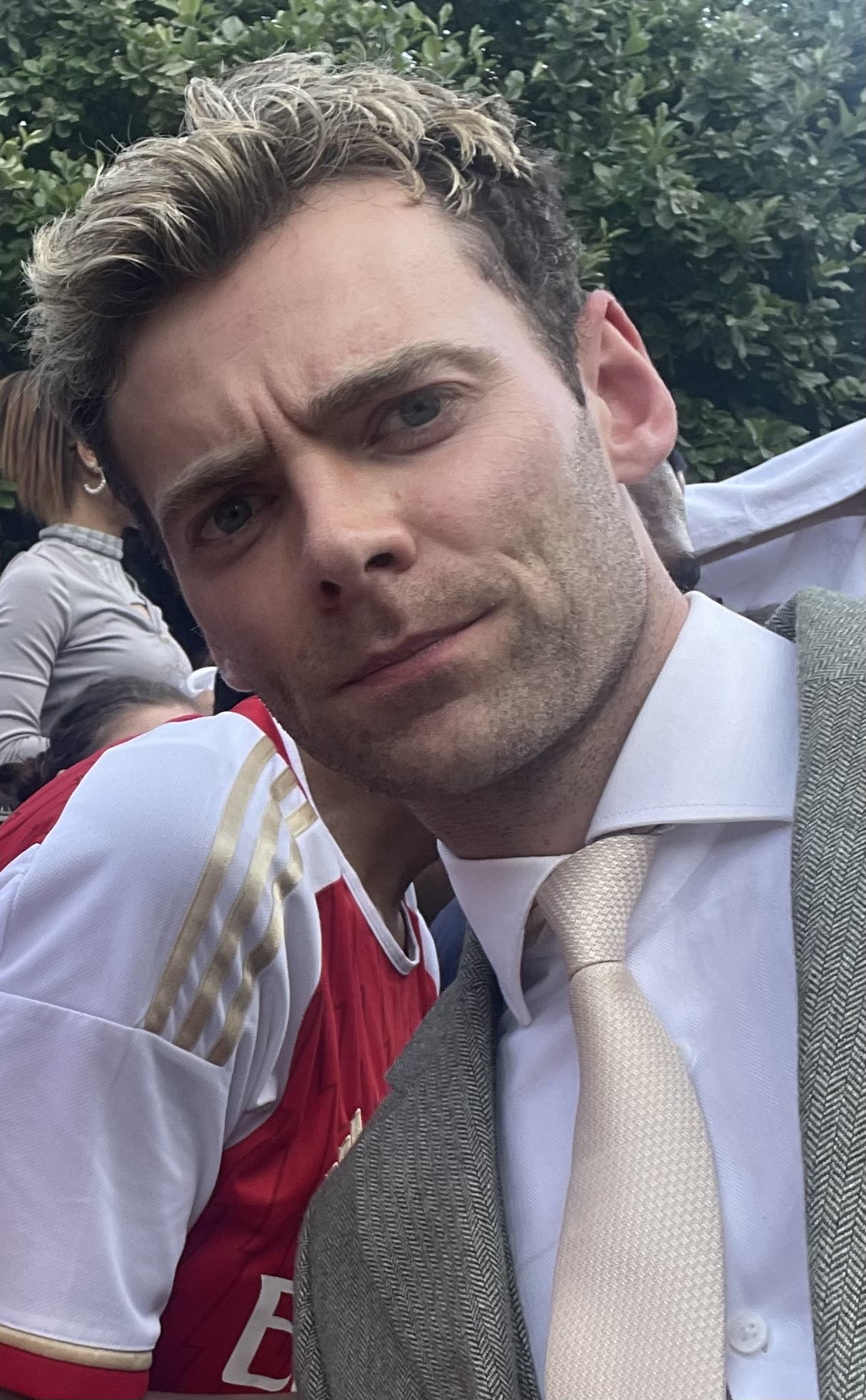
- Law in 2025
- Born: Thomas John Law; 17 December 1992 (age 33); Potters Bar, Hertfordshire, England
- Occupation: Actor
- Years active: 2005–present
- Television: EastEnders; The Bay

Thomas John Law (born 17 December 1992) is an English actor and singer. He is known for playing Peter Beale in the BBC soap opera EastEnders from 2006 to 2010, before reprising the role from 2023 onwards. Between 2021 and 2023, he appeared in the ITV drama series The Bay as DC Eddie Martin.

== Early life ==
Law was born in Potters Bar, Hertfordshire, to Trish and Robert Law and grew up in Potters Bar with his two older sisters. He also has family in Australia. Law attended Chancellor's School in Brookmans Park.

== Career ==
Law began modelling at the age of four and made his television debut in 2005 with a recurring role in the BBC One medical drama Casualty. He would later return as a guest in 2014.

=== EastEnders ===
In 2006, Law became the fifth actor to take over the role of Peter Beale in EastEnders, taking over from James Martin. Law was in a scene nominated for Spectacular Scene of the Year at the 2008 British Soap Awards. In November 2010, it was announced that Law would be leaving the soap after four years, and he made his final appearance in December 2010. The role of Peter was later recast to Ben Hardy between 2013 and 2015, and later to Dayle Hudson who played the role from 2020 to 2022.

In June 2023, Law made an unannounced return to EastEnders, taking over the role of Peter for a second time in a storyline that accommodated the return of Peter's parents, Cindy (Michelle Collins) and Ian Beale (Adam Woodyatt). The story also saw the character reunite with the mother of his child, Lauren Branning (Jacqueline Jossa). It was then announced that Law would be returning to the show on a permanent basis.

=== Other work ===
In 2011, Law made his stage debut as the titular role in Peter Pan. He also played Ste on the 2015 UK tour of Beautiful Thing alongside Sam Jackson and Charlie Brooks.

Law landed small film roles in The World's End in 2013, Unhallowed Ground in 2015, and Gutterdämmerung and the American teen musical A Cinderella Story: If the Shoe Fits opposite Sofia Carson in 2016.

In 2021, Law joined the cast of the ITV crime drama The Bay for its second series on as DC Eddie Martin. Metro called it his "small screen comeback". He went on to appear in the third and fourth series, before his departure from the series was announced in 2023 due to scheduling conflicts with EastEnders.

== Philanthropy ==
In 2007 and 2008, Law took part in Children In Need alongside the cast of EastEnders. Other notable charity work has included playing at the Alan Ball Memorial Cup in 2007, the opening of the kitchens at the University Hospitals of Leicester.

In December 2007, Law was invited to Luton & Dunstable Hospital by his aunt, where he spent time with children who had to stay in the wards over Christmas. After the event, hospital spokesman Barry Mayes said "[Law] gave a big chunk of his time. He was very pleasant, mature and humble, and really homed in on the children and how they were feeling."

In February 2010, Law attended a fundraising event along with other members of the EastEnders cast to raise money for victims of the 2010 Haiti earthquake. The event took place at the Ricoh Arena in Coventry.

From 2024-2026, Law has participated in the annual "Scarlett's Fundraising Football Match" alongside other celebrities and "EastEnders'" cast members to raise money to support the rehabilitation of individuals with spinal cord injuries.The matches take place at Sutton United FC Stadium.

== Filmography ==
=== Film ===
Year	Title	Role	Notes
2013	The World's End	Young Gary King	
2015	Unhallowed Ground	Daniel "Danny" Gordon	
2016	Gutterdämmerung	Pete the Mod	
2016	A Cinderella Story: If the Shoe Fits	Reed West	Direct-to-video
2018	The Inner	Freddie	Short film
2021	Framed	Karl	
2021	Last Train to Christmas	Young Tony Towers	

=== Television ===
Year	Title	Role	Notes
2005, 2014	Casualty	Matt Haddon / Sean Starky	5 episodes
2006–2010, 2023–present	EastEnders	Peter Beale	Regular role
2007–2009	Children in Need	Himself	
2013	Sadie J	Callum	
2019	Living the Dream	Wyatt	Episode: "Endangered Species"
2021–2023	The Bay	DC Eddie Martin	Main role

== Stage ==
Year	Title	Role	Notes
2010	Peter Pan	Peter Pan	The Lowry, Salford Quays, Greater Manchester
2015	Beautiful Thing	Ste	UK tour
