= Manganate =

Chemical compound

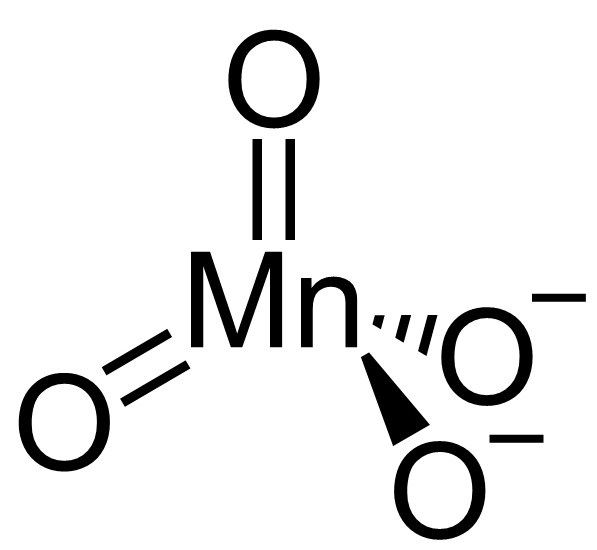
Structure of manganate

In inorganic nomenclature, a manganate is any negatively charged molecular entity with manganese as the central atom. However, the name is usually used to refer to the tetraoxidomanganate(2−) anion, MnO_{4}^{2−}, also known as manganate(VI) because it contains manganese in the +6 oxidation state. Manganates are the only known manganese(VI) compounds.

Other manganates include hypomanganate or manganate(V), MnO_{4}^{3−}, permanganate or manganate(VII), MnO_{4}^{−}, and the dimanganate or dimanganate(III) Mn_{2}O_{6}^{6−}.

A manganate(IV) anion MnO_{4}^{4−} has been prepared by radiolysis of dilute solutions of permanganate. It is mononuclear in dilute solution, and shows a strong absorption in the ultraviolet and a weaker absorption at 650 nm.

== Structure ==
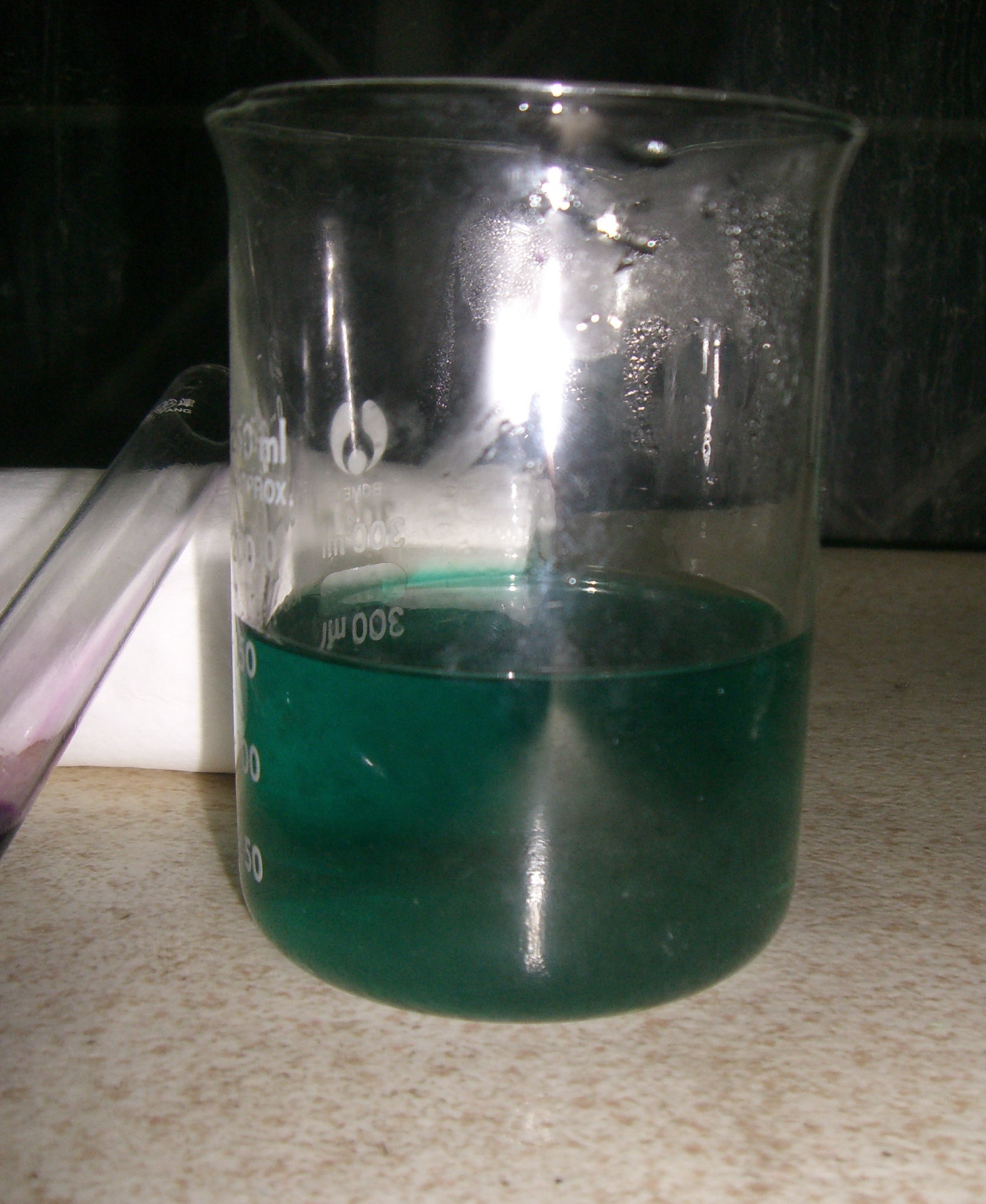
Solution containing the manganate(VI) ion

The manganate(VI) ion is tetrahedral, similar to sulfate or chromate: indeed, manganates are often isostructural with sulfates and chromates, a fact first noted by Eilhard Mitscherlich in 1831. The manganese–oxygen distance is 165.9 pm, about 3 pm longer than in permanganate. As a d^{1} ion it is paramagnetic and should exhibit Jahn–Teller distortion, but any deviation from the tetrahedral geometry is too small to be detected by X-ray crystallography. Manganates are dark green in colour, with a visible absorption maximum of λ_{max} = 606 nm (ε = 1710 dm^{3} mol^{−1} cm^{−1}). The Raman spectrum has also been reported.

== Preparation ==
Sodium and potassium manganates are usually prepared in the laboratory by stirring the equivalent permanganate in a concentrated solution (5–10 M) of the hydroxide for 24 hours or with heating.

4 MnO_{4}^{−} + 4 OH^{−} → 4 MnO_{4}^{2−} + 2 H_{2}O + O_{2}

Potassium manganate is prepared industrially, as an intermediate to potassium permanganate, by dissolving manganese dioxide in molten potassium hydroxide with potassium nitrate or air as the oxidizing agent.

2 MnO_{2} + 4 OH^{−} + O_{2} → 2 MnO_{4}^{2−} + 2 H_{2}O

== Disproportionation ==
Manganates are unstable towards disproportionation in all but the most alkaline of aqueous solutions. The ultimate products are permanganate and manganese dioxide, but the kinetics are complex and the mechanism may involve protonated and/or manganese(V) species.

== Uses ==
Manganates, particularly the insoluble barium manganate, BaMnO_{4}, have been used as oxidizing agents in organic synthesis: they will oxidize primary alcohols to aldehydes and then to carboxylic acids, and secondary alcohols to ketones. Barium manganate has also been used to oxidize hydrazones to diazo compounds.

== Related compounds ==
Manganate is formally the conjugate base of hypothetical manganic acid H_{2}MnO_{4}, which cannot be formed because of its rapid disproportionation. However, its second acid dissociation constant has been estimated by pulse radiolysis techniques:

HMnO_{4}^{−} ⇌ MnO_{4}^{2−} + H^{+} pK_{a} = 7.4 ± 0.1

=== Manganites ===
The name "manganite" is used for compounds formerly believed to contain the anion MnO_{3}^{3−}, with manganese in the +3 oxidation state. However, most of these "manganites" do not contain discrete oxyanions, but are mixed oxides with perovskite (LaMn^{III}O_{3}, CaMn^{IV}O_{3}), spinel (LiMn_{2}^{III,IV}O_{4}) or sodium chloride (LiMn^{III}O_{2}, NaMn^{III}O_{2}) structures.

One exception is potassium dimanganate(III), K_{6}Mn_{2}O_{6}, which contains discrete Mn_{2}O_{6}^{6−} anions.
