= Unhallowed Ground =

- Film poster
- Directed by: Russell England
- Written by: Paul Raschid
- Produced by: Neville Raschid
- Starring: Ameet Chana; Poppy Drayton; Marcus Griffiths
- Cinematography: Glen Warrillow
- Edited by: Simon Greenwood
- Music by: Xiaotian Shi
- Production company: Aviary Films
- Distributed by: Kaleidoscope (UK); Edel Media & Entertainment (Germany)
- Release date: 25 April 2015 (BIFF)
- Running time: 97 minutes
- Country: United Kingdom
- Language: English

Unhallowed Ground is a 2015 British independent horror film that was directed by Russell England, marking his feature film directorial debut outside of television. The movie had its world premiere on 25 April 2015 at the British Independent Film Festival. It received a limited theatrical release in the United Kingdom during June 2015, followed by a DVD release in the United Kingdom and Germany later that same year.

== Plot ==
A group of male boarding school cadets, Aki, Rish and Danny, have been assigned with guarding Dhoultham School on the last day of their term. This initially seems like it'd be a boring, routine assignment that will pay off only with experience, until the cadets find that they'll be joined by some female cadets from another school, Verity, Sophie and Meenah. The teens quickly decide to throw an impromptu party, however their fun is soon spoiled when they realize that Dhoultham has been the site of multiple horrific deaths that date back to the 1600s, when many died from the Black Plague. The group soon finds that the school is very haunted and that the ghosts are out for blood. To make matters worse, they're not the only ones trapped in the school as would-be cat burglars Jazz and Shane have broken into the school with the intent to rob it blind.

== Cast ==
- Ameet Chana as Jazz
- Poppy Drayton as Verity Wickes
- Marcus Griffiths as Aki Adebola
- Thomas Law as Daniel "Danny" Gordon
- Andrew Lewis as Dr. Carmichael
- Rachel Petladwala as Meena Shah
- Morgane Polanski as Sophie Dunant
- Paul Raschid as Rishi "Rish" Patel
- Will Thorp as Shane
- Richard Derrington as Dr. Richard Graystone

== Reception ==
Critical reception for Unhallowed Ground have been mixed. Common criticisms for the film centered around its characters and scares, which The Guardian and Time Out considered to be ineffective. Dread Central gave a mixed review, stating that it was "a competent, but largely uninspired horror jaunt that, in whole, proves just about worthwhile on the strength of its cast and a smattering of good ideas (not to mention the seriously cool plague doctor design). But you certainly needn’t kick yourself too hard if you give it a miss." Nerdly and Contact Music were more favorable in their reviews, as Nerdly felt that the film grew on them over time and Contact Music commented that it was a "terrifically atmospheric little horror movie that's definitely worth a look for genre fans".

=== Awards ===
- Best Horror Film Award at the London Independent Film Festival (2015, won)
- Best Supporting Actor at the London Independent Film Festival (2015, won - Marcus Griffiths)
- Best Supporting Actress at the London Independent Film Festival (2015, won - Rachel Petladwala)
