= Mangini =

Mangini may refer to:

== People ==
- Cecilia Mangini (1927–2021), Italian film director
- Eric Mangini (born 1971), American football coach
- Jose Thiago Mangini (1920–1984), Brazilian chess master
- Mark Mangini (born 1956), American sound editor
- Mike Mangini (born 1963), American drummer
- Janet Mangini, American lawyer in the Joe Camel controversy

== Other used ==
- Talhi Mangini, a town in Pakistan
- French destroyer Mangini
