= Jon Kortajarena =

Spanish model & actor (born 1985)

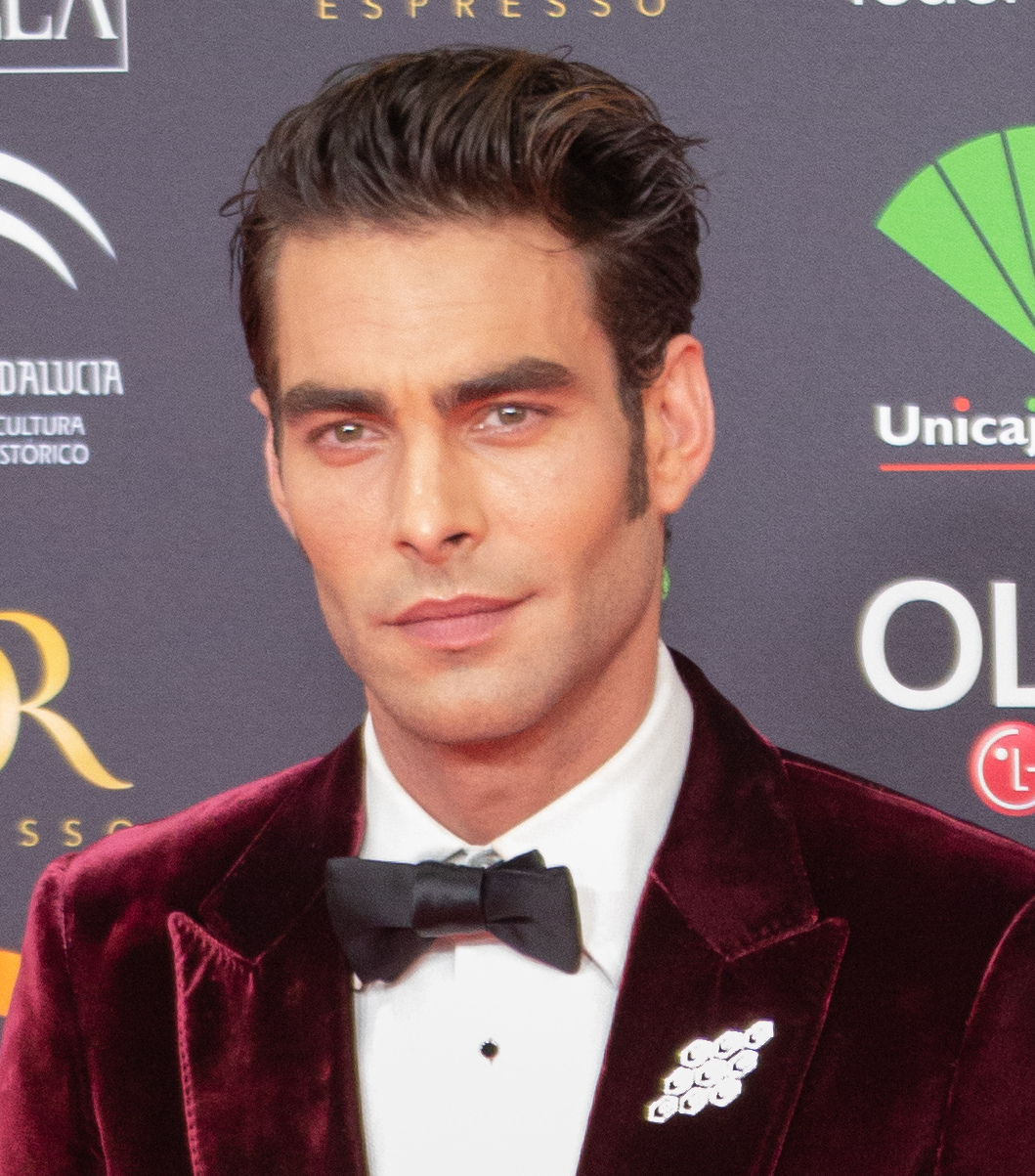
- Kortajarena at the 34th Goya Awards in January 2020
- Born: Jon Kortajarena Redruello; 19 May 1985 (age 41); Bilbao, Spain
- Modelling information
- Height: 6 ft 2 in (188 cm)
- Hair colour: Brown
- Eye colour: Hazel
- Agency: The Lions (New York); Success Models (Paris); Why Not Model Management (Milan); Select Model Management (London); View Management (Barcelona); YC Models (Brussels); Scoop Models (Copenhagen)
- Website: www.jonkortajarena.com

Jon Kortajarena Redruello (born 19 May 1985) is a Spanish model and actor. He has done advertising campaigns for Just Cavalli, Versace, Giorgio Armani, Guerlain, Bally, Etro, Trussardi, Diesel, Mangano, Lagerfeld, Pepe Jeans but notably H&M, Zara, Guess, and Tom Ford for his consecutive seasons with the brands. On 26 June 2009, Forbes ranked Kortajarena eighth in The World's 10 Most Successful Male Models.

== Career ==
=== Early life and career ===
Kortajarena was born in Bilbao, Biscay, Basque Country, Spain. He was discovered in September 2003 while vacationing in Barcelona and accompanying a friend who was invited to attend a fashion show. While there, a booker noticed him and persuaded him to give the fashion world a go. His first professional experience was in a Madrid Fashion Week show for Roberto Verino. He left Bilbao, his hometown, and ventured into the fashion industry in Paris. In 2004, at the age of 18, Kortajarena became the face of Just Cavalli for Roberto Cavalli's spring campaign which quickly jet started his career. He made his international fashion show debut at the fall Milan and Paris fashion weeks for Emporio Armani and John Galliano. Two months later, in New York, Steven Meisel photographed him for Versace. Kortajarena's other runway credentials include walking for Chanel, Versace, Balmain, Bottega Veneta, Dolce & Gabbana, Etro, Salvatore Ferragamo, Carolina Herrera, Giorgio Armani, John Galliano, Jean Paul Gautier, and Valentino in Milan and Paris. Kortajarena appeared in a commercial for the sugar-free Fanta Z "Mediterraneo", a TV ad in 2005 which poked fun at the departed Fanta Lite. Its content, though, quickly drew complaints in Britain and it eventually became restricted to the post-9 PM broadcasts.

=== 2007–2009 ===
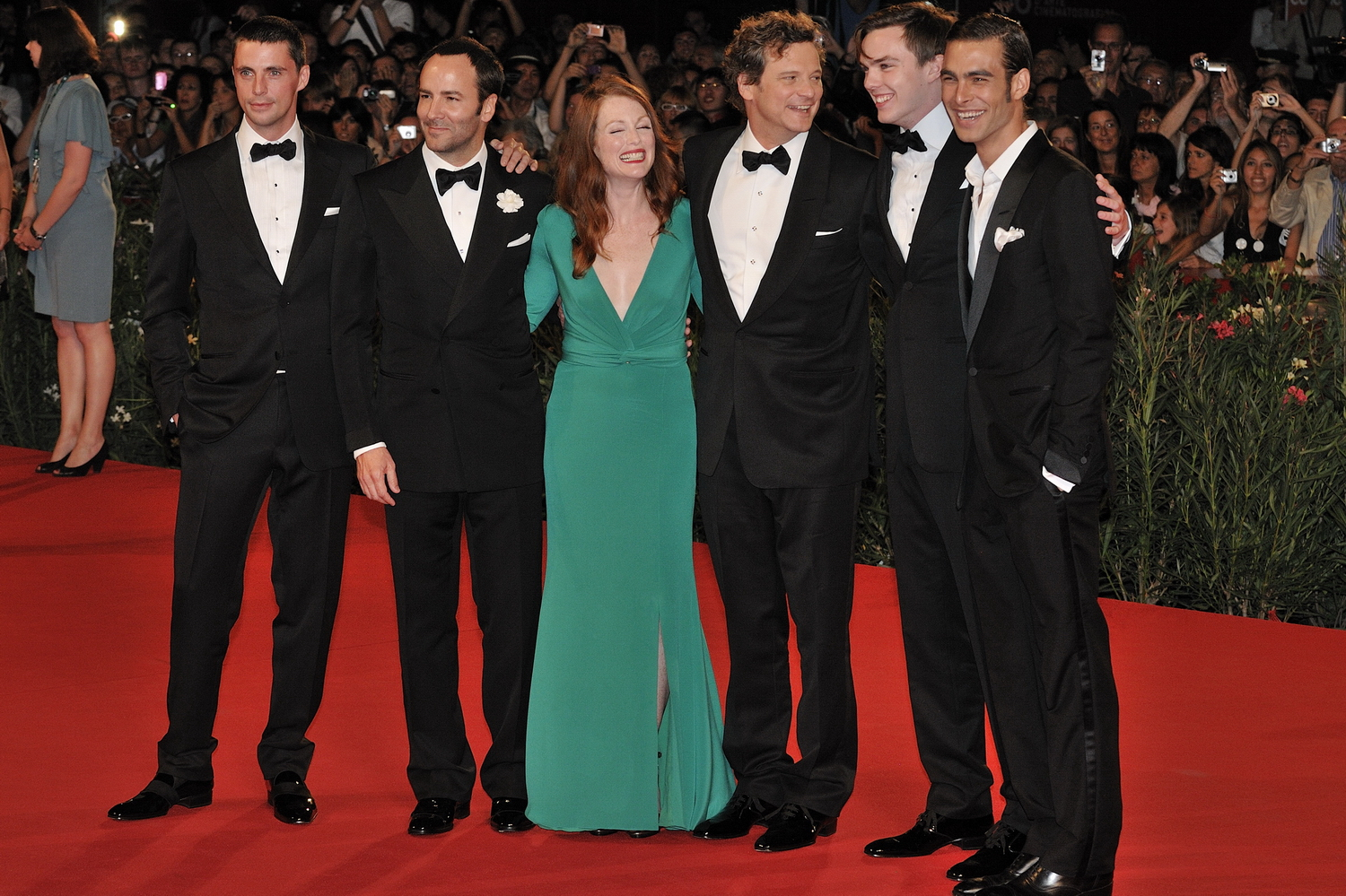
Kortajarena (right) with Matthew Goode, Tom Ford, Julianne Moore, Colin Firth and Nicholas Hoult at the 66th Venice Film Festival.

In 2007, Kortajarena signed with Guess and renewed his contract again in 2008. With new campaigns on the stands, Terry Richardson photographed Kortajarena for Tom Ford alongside Noah Mills and became the label's signature male model for the next consecutive seasons. He was featured on the cover of the spring/summer 2008 issue of L'Officiel Hommes magazine, devoting him 200 pages, with the cover title reading "200 Pages of Fashion with Jon Kortajarena".

It was the first time a male model had achieved this and consequently it became a reference in the industry; other models to follow such honor were Andres Velencoso and Arthur Sales. For the 2009 spring men's wear and eyewear advertising campaigns Jon was art directed and photographed, for the first time, by Tom Ford himself.

On 26 June 2009, Forbes published its list of "The World's 10 Most Successful Male Models" ranking Kortajarena in 8th place. In November Kortajarena was named by German GQ as "Model of the Year". Spain's Marie Claire awards Prix de la Moda awarded him "Best Spanish Model" for 2009.

=== 2010–present ===
Breaking into 2010 with ad campaigns for H&M, True Trussardi and Esprit; Kortajarena modeled alongside Alexa Chung for Pepe Jeans fall/winter Campaign. He was in the Next autumn/winter campaign and in its TV advert that launched on 10 September, alongside Emanuela de Paula.

In 2011 he was selected as one of the models to star in Lacoste's $66 million new advertising concept under the new tagline, "Unconventional Chic". The ads were shot by Mert and Marcus showing models wearing the iconic white Lacoste polo shirts worn over eveningwear. He fronted the cover of the March 2011 issue of Vogue Spain alongside Anja Rubik and compatriot Andres Velencoso. Described as "an icon of charm and masculinity", Kortajarena was chosen as the protagonist for the special video version of Roberto Cavalli Men's Spring/Summer 2012 runway and opened the show held at the Palazzo Serbelloni in Milan. For the fall campaigns he became the face of David Yurman for the third consecutive time and was photographed by legendary photographer Peter Lindbergh.

Kortajarena played Alex in one episode of the 2020 Amazon Prime Video series Tales from the Loop.

== Personal life ==
Kortajarena speaks Basque, Spanish, and English. He went to an ikastola school until he was 10 years old, but due to traveling, he went on to enroll in public, private, and Catholic schools thereafter. His mother is a hairdresser and she often styles his hair. If he was not modeling, he would be a full-time actor; however, he notes that interior designing and photography are some fields he has always been curious about. His hobbies include watching films, reading books by Hermann Hesse, sunbathing, going to the mountains with friends, and listening to music. He describes himself as an "ultimate romantic". Some of his favorite novels include Perfume, The Wheel of Life by Elisabeth Kübler-Ross, and Siddhartha. Between 2014 and 2016, Kortajarena dated Welsh actor Luke Evans.

== Ad campaigns ==
| Year | Campaigns |
|---|---|
| 2016 | F/W · Fergie Music Video "M.I.L.F.$" |
| 2015 | F/W · Madonna Music Video "Bitch I'm Madonna" |
| 2013 | F/W · HUDSON Jeans |
| 2012 | F/W · Kenneth Cole, Zara, David Yurman, Madonna Music Video "Girl Gone Wild", Roberto Cavalli, 3 Vogue covers |
| 2011 | S/S · Lacoste · Pepe Jeans · Replay · David Yurman · F/W · David Yurman, Karl Lagerfeld, Lacoste |
| 2010 | S/S · Belvedere Vodka · El Palacio de Hierro · Next · H&M · Matinique · Mangano · Esprit · Mauro Grifoni · Trussardi Jeans · Etienne Aigner · F/W · Trussardi Jeans · H&M^{*} · John Richmond · Matinique · Lagerfeld · Pepe Jeans · Esprit · David Yurman · 212 VIP fragrance^{*} · Next^{*} |
| 2009 | S/S · Brian Atwood · Diesel · Tom Ford · Etro · Guess · F/W · H&M · Matinique · Mangano · Tom Ford Eyewear · Jaeger · Mauro Grifoni |
| 2008 | S/S · Bally · Guess · Etro · Mango · Tom Ford Eyewear · Trussardi · F/W · Carlo Pignatelli · Guess · Tom Ford · JPG Jeans · John Richmond · Wormland |
| 2007 | S/S · Guess · F/W · Armani |
| 2005 | F/W · Fanta Z^{*} · Macy's · Springfield |
| 2004 | S/S · Just Cavalli · F/W · Versace |
Sources: Models.com, The Fashionisto, Armani-07

^* TV spot

== Filmography ==
=== Film ===
| Year | Title | Role | Notes |
|---|---|---|---|
| 2009 | A Single Man | Carlos | |
| 2016 | Acantilado | Julián | |
| 2017 | Skins | Guille | |
| 2018 | The Aspern Papers | Jeffrey Aspern | |
| 2019 | A Remarkable Tale | Guiri | |
| 2020 | Eurovision Song Contest: The Story of Fire Saga | Corin Vladvitch | |
| 2023 | Heart of Stone | the Blond | |

=== Television ===
| Year | Title | Role | Network | Notes |
|---|---|---|---|---|
| 2017 | Quantico | Felix Cordova | ABC | Recurring role |
| 2018 | La verdad | Marcos Eguia | Telecinco | Main role |
| 2019-2020 | High Seas | Nicolás Vázquez | Netflix | Main role |
| 2020 | Tales from the Loop | Alex | Amazon Prime Video | |
| 2021 | Drag Race España | Himself | Atresplayer Premium | Episode 1 |
| 2022 | El Inmortal | Himself | Movistar Plus+ | All episodes |

=== Music video ===
| Year | Title | Singer | Notes |
|---|---|---|---|
| 2012 | "Girl Gone Wild" | Madonna | |
| 2015 | "Bitch I'm Madonna" | Madonna | |
| 2016 | "M.I.L.F. $" | Fergie | |
| 2016 | "Wolves" | Kanye West | |
