= Manganite (disambiguation) =

Manganite a mineral composed of manganese oxide-hydroxide, MnO(OH).

Manganite may also refer to:

- Lanthanum manganite, an inorganic compound with the formula LaMnO_{3}
- Lanthanum strontium manganite, an oxide ceramic material
- Potassium manganite
