= Mangan =

Mangan may refer to:

- Mangan (surname), including a list of people with the name
- Mangan, India, the capital of the district of North Sikkim in the Indian state of Sikkim
- Mangan in Japanese Mahjong, a type of high scoring hand in Japanese mahjong

== See also ==
- Manga (disambiguation)
- Mangana (disambiguation)
