= Mangano =

Mangano is an Italian surname. Notable people with the surname include:

- Anthony Mangano, American actor
- Ed Mangano (born 1962), American politician from New York
- Guy James Mangano (1930–2025), American politician and jurist from New York
- Joy Mangano (born 1956), American inventor
- Lawrence Mangano (1892–1944), American mobster
- Philip Mangano (1898–1951), American mafioso
- Silvana Mangano (1930–1989), Italian actress
- Venero Mangano (1921–2017), American mafioso
- Vincent Mangano (1888–1951), American mafioso
- Vittorio Mangano (1940–2000), Italian member of Cosa Nostra

== See also ==
- Maingano, a fish in the family Cichlidae, scientific name Melanochromis cyaneorhabdos
