= Morgane Polanski =

French actress (born 1993)

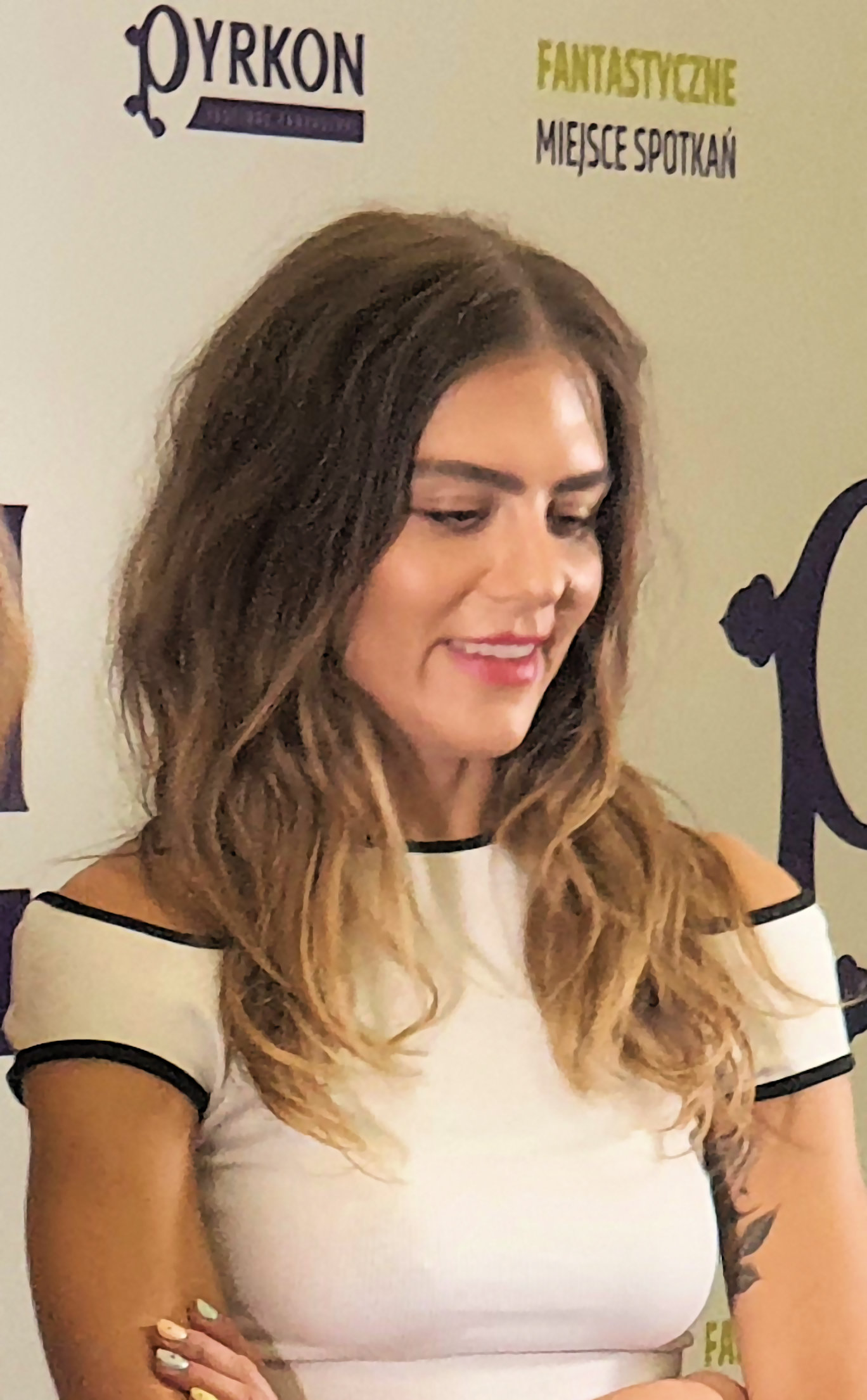
- Polanski in 2024
- Born: 20 January 1993 (age 33); Paris, France
- Education: Drama Centre London; Central School of Speech and Drama
- Occupation: Actress
- Years active: 2002–present
- Parent(s): Roman Polanski; Emmanuelle Seigner

Morgane Polanski (born 20 January 1993) is a French actress, best known for portraying Princess Gisla in the History Channel series Vikings.

== Early life and education ==
Polanski is the daughter of French-Polish filmmaker Roman Polanski and French actress Emmanuelle Seigner. She has a younger brother, Elvis. Polanski was raised bilingually in French and Polish.

Polanski was educated at the International School of Paris. She later studied acting at the Drama Centre London and the Central School of Speech and Drama, graduating in 2014.

== Career ==
Polanski made her credited acting debut in her father's 2002 film The Pianist. She appeared in two more of his films, Oliver Twist (2005) and The Ghost Writer (2010), in the latter of which she had her first speaking role.

In 2015, Polanski appeared in the British independent film Unhallowed Ground and began portraying Princess Gisla in the History Channel series Vikings. Princess Gisla was introduced in season three of Vikings as a daughter of the French Emperor Charles the Bald (while a legendary French princess named Gisela was the daughter of his grandson, Charles the Simple).

She directed the shorts The Stroke (2016) and The Understudy (2018), the former of which she also wrote.

In 2019, Polanski starred in Rene van Pannevis debut feature Looted. Pannevis stated, "I hadn't worked with Morgane before so she was a bit lost after her first scene. Thankfully, she picked it up very quickly and her performance is beautiful. I mean, growing up in that environment, I knew she had the skills".

In 2021 she appeared in the Wes Anderson's film The French Dispatch.

It was revealed that Polanski would return to her role as Princess Gisla with an appearance in season six (part two) of Vikings, which aired at the end of 2020.

In 2021, Polanski directed Dame Siân Phillips in Through the Looking Glass, a short film which was screening at Venice Film Festival. Polanski stated, "When I find a project and I know in my gut I need to direct it, I feel no fear. I know how I want to interpret it, what point of view I want to adopt, how I want the colors, the tone. I didn't have any insecurities about approaching Dame Sian's agent and sending her the script. I wanted to recreate that feeling of a fairytale, Snow White with her lips as red as blood; the talking mirror. Sunset Boulevard was also on our mood board. The idea was that the production should have a feel of heightened femininity that's OTT, fantastical".

== Filmography ==
| Title | Year | Role | Notes |
|---|---|---|---|
| The Ninth Gate | 1999 | Young Girl at airport terminal (uncredited) | |
| The Pianist | 2002 | Girl | |
| Oliver Twist | 2005 | Farmer's daughter | |
| The Ghost Writer | 2010 | Hotel receptionist | |
| Unhallowed Ground | 2015 | Sophie Dunant | |
| Vikings | 2015–17, 2020 | Princess Gisla | TV series |
| The Wife | 2017 | Smithie Girl Lorraine | |
| In Darkness | 2018 | Nina | |
| The Aspern Papers | 2018 | Valentina Prest | |
| Looted | 2019 | Kasia | |
| The French Dispatch | 2021 | Girlfriend | |
| The Palace | 2023 | Zula | |
| The Partisan | 2024 | Krystyna Skarbek | |
