= Cadmium permanganate =

cadmium permanganate
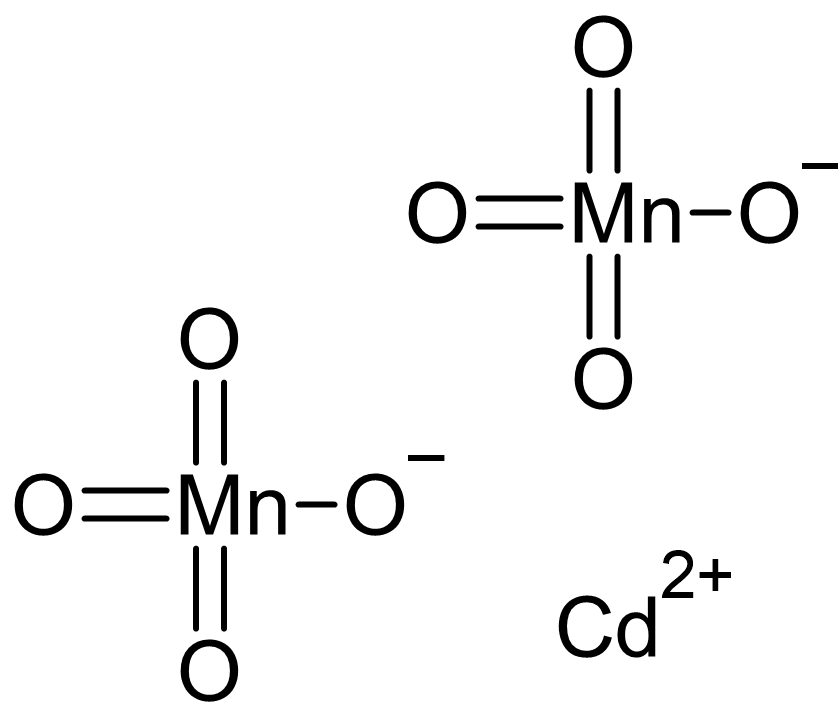

Identifiers
CAS Number	34057-37-9 anhydrous; 13520-63-3 hexahydrate
3D model (JSmol)	Interactive image
PubChem CID	21872968
- InChI: InChI=1S/Cd.2Mn.8O/q+2;;;;;;;;;2*-1 Key: ZACBZJVABWSYQB-UHFFFAOYSA-N
- SMILES: [Cd+2].O=[Mn](=O)(=O)[O-].O=[Mn](=O)(=O)[O-]

Properties
Chemical formula	Cd(MnO_{4})_{2}
Molar mass	350.28
Appearance	dark purple crystals
Solubility in water	soluble
- Except where otherwise noted, data are given for materials in their standard state (at 25 °C [77 °F], 100 kPa). Infobox references

Cadmium permanganate is an inorganic compound with the chemical formula Cd(MnO_{4})_{2}. It can form the hexahydrate Cd(MnO_{4})_{2}·6H_{2}O.

== Preparation ==
Cadmium permanganate can be obtained by reacting cadmium sulfate and barium permanganate. After removing the barium sulfate precipitate, the solution is crystallized in the dark:

Ba(MnO_{4})_{2} + CdSO_{4} → Cd(MnO_{4})_{2} + BaSO_{4}↓

Cadmium permanganate can also be produced by reacting manganese heptoxide with cadmium oxide or cadmium hydroxide.

== Properties ==
Cadmium permanganate hexahydrate loses water of crystallisation at 61~62 °C, and anhydrate can be obtained at a constant temperature of 90 °C. The anhydrous form begins to decompose at 108 °C:

Cd(MnO_{4})_{2} → CdMnO_{3} + MnO_{2} + 3/_{2} O_{2}↑
