= Barium permanganate =

Identifiers
CAS Number	7787-36-2
3D model (JSmol)	Interactive image
ChemSpider	22990
ECHA InfoCard	100.029.191
EC Number	232-110-1
PubChem CID	24587
UNII	YQV1TGU8UP
CompTox Dashboard (EPA)	DTXSID301015790
- InChI: InChI=1S/Ba.2Mn.4O/q+2;;;;;;;;;2*-1 Key: YFFSWKZRTPVKSO-UHFFFAOYSA-N
- SMILES: [O-][Mn](=O)(=O)=O.[O-][Mn](=O)(=O)=O.[Ba+2]

Properties
Chemical formula	Ba(MnO_{4})_{2}
Molar mass	375.198 g/mol
Appearance	dark violet to brown crystals
Odor	odorless
Density	3.77 g/cm^{3}
Melting point	200 °C (392 °F; 473 K) (decomposes)
Solubility in water	62.5 g/100 mL (29 °C)
Solubility	decomposes in alcohol

Structure
Crystal structure	rhombic

Hazards
NFPA 704 (fire diamond)	2 0 0 OX

Related compounds
Other cations	Magnesium permanganate Strontium permanganate
- Except where otherwise noted, data are given for materials in their standard state (at 25 °C [77 °F], 100 kPa). Infobox references

Barium permanganate is a chemical compound, with the formula Ba(MnO_{4})_{2}. It forms violet to brown crystals that are soluble in water.

== Preparation ==
Barium permanganate may be produced by disproportionation of barium manganate in a mildly acidic solution, including solutions carbon dioxide or sulfuric acid:

3 BaMnO_{4} + 2 CO_{2} → Ba(MnO_{4})_{2} + 2 BaCO_{3} + MnO_{2}
3 BaMnO_{4} + 2 H_{2}SO_{4} → Ba(MnO_{4})_{2} + 2 BaSO_{4} + MnO_{2} + 2 H_{2}O

It can also be prepared by oxidation of barium manganate with strong oxidants. Preparations relying on aqueous reactions of barium manganate are extremely slow process due to the low solubility of the manganate.

Another way to synthesize barium permanganate is by the reaction between silver permanganate and barium chloride. Highly pure samples can be obtained from the similar reaction between potassium permanganate and aluminium sulfate to form aluminium permanganate, which is then reacted with a stoichiometric amount of barium hydroxide.

== Reactions ==
Barium permanganate is a strong oxidizer. It is thermally stable up to 180 °C (356 °F). Above this temperature it decomposes in two stages, between 180–350 °C (356–662 °F) and 500–700 °C (932–1,292 °F).

2 Ba(MnO_{4})_{2} → 2 BaMnO_{3} + 2 MnO_{2} + 3 O_{2}
4 BaMnO_{3} → 4 BaO + 2 Mn_{2}O_{3} + O_{2}

The decomposition has been shown to proceed at slow rates above 160 °C (320 °F), and that irradiation with UV or X-rays lowers this temperature. Crystal defects and impurities play a role in the mechanism.

Permanganic acid can be prepared by the reaction of dilute sulfuric acid with a solution barium permanganate, the insoluble barium sulfate byproduct being removed by filtering:

Ba(MnO_{4})_{2} + H_{2}SO_{4} → 2 HMnO_{4} + BaSO_{4}

The sulfuric acid used must be dilute; reactions of permanganates with concentrated sulfuric acid yield the anhydride, manganese heptoxide.
