= Dana classification system =

Mineral classification

Dana's classification is a mineral classification developed by James Dwight Dana. It is based on the chemical composition and structure of minerals. It is mainly used in English-speaking countries, especially in the United States.

The mineral classification used by the International Mineralogical Association is the Nickel-Strunz classification.

== History ==
The classification of minerals was based on chemical composition by Dana in the fourth edition (1854, in two volumes) of his book System of Mineralogy. For the 20th century, this classification was completed thanks to scientific progress, particularly in the field of crystallography. In 1941, Karl Hugo Strunz used it to construct his classification. Dana's original classification was further developed, and a new classification was published in 1997.

== Classification structure ==
Minerals are arranged in a hierarchical system. Each mineral has a classification number, made up of four numbers separated by dots, enabling unambiguous identification even when minerals are known by several names (synonymy). The first number represents the mineral class. The second number represents the mineral type, in some cases taking into account its atomic structure. The third number represents a group of minerals of similar structure. The fourth number gives the unambiguous identification of the mineral.

== Example ==
Kieserite group.

- 29. Acidic and normal hydrated sulfates
  - 29.06.: acid and normal hydrated sulfates of the formula AXO_{4}-x(H_{2}O)
    - 29.06.02.: kieserite group (monohydrates)
      - 29.06.02.01.: kieserite MgSO_{4}-(H_{2}O), space group C2/c
      - 29.06.02.02.: szomolnokite FeSO_{4}-(H_{2}O), space group A2/a
      - 29.06.02.03.: szmikite MnSO_{4}-(H_{2}O), space group A2/a
      - 29.06.02.04.: povinite (Cu,Fe,Zn)SO_{4}-(H_{2}O), space group P1
      - 29.06.02.05.: gunningite (Zn,Mn)SO_{4}-(H_{2}O), space group A2/a
      - 29.06.02.06.: dwornikite (Ni,Fe)SO_{4}-(H_{2}O), space group C2/c
      - 29.06.02.07.: cobaltkieserite CoSO_{4}-H_{2}O, space group C2/c

== Mineral classes ==
Elements	Chemical element
Sulfides and sulfosalts	01. Sulfides; 02. Sulfosalts
Oxides and hydroxides	04. Basic Oxides; 05. Oxides containing uranium and thorium; 06. Hydroxides and oxides containing hydroxylation; 07. Multiple oxides; 08. Multiple oxides containing niobium, tantalum and/or titanium
Halides	09. Halogenides; 10. Oxyhalides and hydroxyhalides; 11. Complex halides - aluminofluorides; 12. Compound halogenides
Carbonates, nitrates and borates	13. Acid carbonates; 14. Non-hydrated normal carbonate; 15. Normal hydrated carbonate; 16a. Carbonate containing hydroxyl anion or halogen; 16b. Carbonate containing hydroxyl anion or halogen; 17. Compound carbonates; 18. Simple nitrate; 19. Nitrates containing hydroxyl anion or halogens; 20. Compound nitrate; 21. Non-hydrated and hydrated iodate; 22. Iodates containing hydroxyl anion or halogen; 23. Compound iodate; 24. Non-hydrated borate; 25. Non-hydrated borate containing hydroxyl anion or halogens; 26. Hydrated borate containing hydroxyl anion or halogens; 27. Compound borate
Sulfates, chromates and molybdates	28. Acidic and normal non-hydrated sulfates; 29. Acid and normal hydrated sulfates; 30. Non-hydrated sulfates containing hydroxyl anion or halogens; 31. Hydrated sulfates containing hydroxyl anion or halogens; 32. Compound sulfates; 33. Selenates and telluratess; 34. Selenites, tellurites and sulfites; 35. Non-hydrated chromates; 36. Hydrated chromates
Phosphates, arsenates and vanadates	37. Non-hydrated acid phosphates; 38. Non-hydrated normal phosphates; 39. Acid phosphates, hydrated; 40. Normal phosphates, hydrated; 41. Non-hydrated phosphates containing hydroxyl anion or halogens; 42. Hydrated phosphates containing hydroxyl anion or halogens; 43. Compound phosphates; 44. Antimoniates; 45. Acid and normal antimonites, arsenites, and phosphites; 46. Basic or halogen-containing antimonites, arsenites, and phosphites; 47. Vanadium oxysalts; 48. Molybdates and tungstates; 49. Basic and hydrated molybdates and tungstates
Organic minerals	50. Organic minerals
Silicates and germanates	
Nesosilicates	51. Nesosilicates containing only isolated [SiO_{4}] tetrahedral groups; 52. Groups of [SiO_{4}] tetrahedra with O, OH, F, and H_{2}O; 53. Groups of [SiO_{4}] tetrahedra with other anions or complex cations; 54. Borosilicates and some beryllosilicates with [BO_{3}].
Sorosilicates	55. Groups Si_{2}O_{7}, generally without additional anion; 56. Groups Si_{2}O_{7} with O, OH, F, and H_{2}O; 57. Insular (Si_{3}O_{10}) and larger non-cyclic groups with Si_{3}O_{10}; 58. Insular, mixed, isolated, and larger tetrahedral groups
Cyclosilicates	59. Three-membered rings [Si_{3}O_{9}].; 60. Four-membered rings [Si_{4}O_{12}].; 61. Six-membered rings [Si_{6}O18].; 62. Eight-membered rings [Si_{8}O_{24}].; 63. Cyclosilicates with condensed rings; 64. Rings with other anions and isolated [SiO_{4}] groups
Inosilicates	65. Unbranched simple chains, periodicity W=1; 66. Unbranched double chains, periodicity W=2; 67. Unbranched chains, periodicity W > 2; 68. Structures with variable chain widths; 69. Chains branched to other chains or loops; 70. Tubular or columnar structures
Phyllosilicates	71. Six-member ring layers; 72. Infinite layers without six-member rings; 73. Condensed tetrahedron layers; 74. Modulated layers
Tectosilicates	75. Tectosilicates; 76. Aluminum and silicon networks; 77. Zeolite group
Unclassified silicates	78. Unclassified silicates

== See also ==
- James Dwight Dana
- Mineral
- Nickel–Strunz classification
- Crystallography
