= Acetic formic anhydride =

Chemical compound C3H4O3

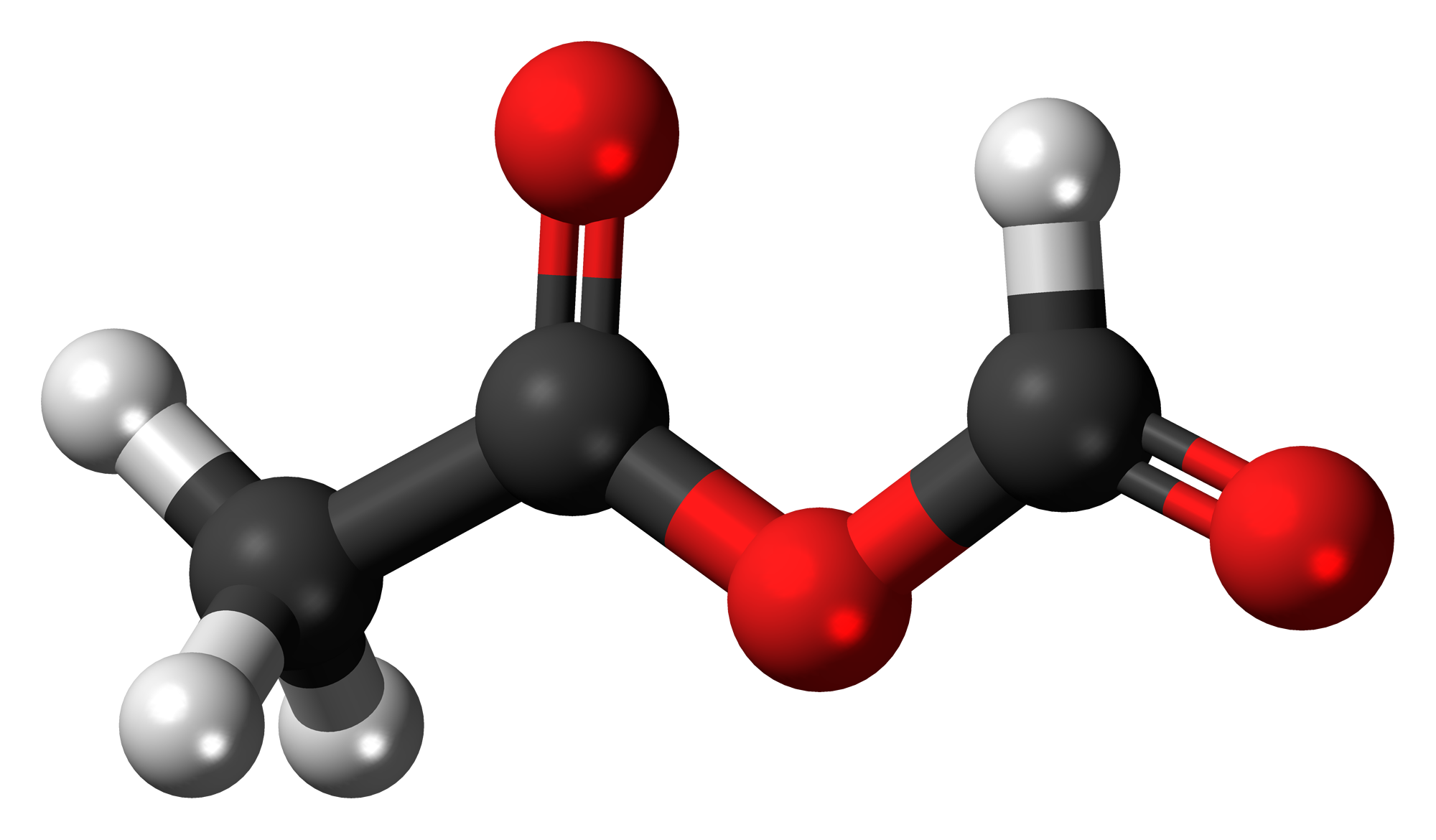

Names
- Preferred IUPAC name Acetic formic anhydride
- Other names: Acetyloxymethanone; Formyl acetate; Formic acetic anhydride; ethanoic methanoic anhydride

Identifiers
| CAS Number | 2258-42-6 |
| 3D model (JSmol) | Interactive image |
| ChemSpider | 67812 |
| PubChem CID | 75269 |
| UNII | GNF4F3WBU5 |
| CompTox Dashboard (EPA) | DTXSID80177103 |
- InChI: InChI=1S/C3H4O3/c1-3(5)6-2-4/h2H,1H3 Key: ORWKVZNEPHTCQE-UHFFFAOYSA-N
- SMILES: CC(=O)OC=O

Properties
| Chemical formula | C_{3}H_{4}O_{3} |
| Molar mass | 88.062 g·mol^{−1} |
| Appearance | colourless liquid |
- Except where otherwise noted, data are given for materials in their standard state (at 25 °C [77 °F], 100 kPa). verify (what is ?) Infobox references

Acetic formic anhydride is an organic compound with the chemical formula C_{3}H_{4}O_{3}, which can be viewed as the mixed anhydride of acetic acid and formic acid. It is used on a laboratory-scale as a formylating agent.

== Preparation ==
Acetic formic anhydride can be produced by reacting sodium formate with acetyl chloride in anhydrous diethyl ether between 23–27 °C. It can also be prepared by the reaction of acetic anhydride and formic acid at 0 °C.

== Properties ==
While more stable than formic anhydride, acetic formic anhydride is thermally unstable and gradually decomposes above about 60 °C, with the evolution of carbon monoxide. Impurities such as pyridine or residual acid can promote this, resulting in decomposition commencing as low as 0 °C. Crude material has been successfully purified by distillation at ≤30 °C under reduced pressure.

== Applications ==
Acetic formic anhydride is a formylation agent for amines, amino acids, and alcohols. It is also a starting material for other compounds such as formyl fluoride.

== See also ==
- Formic anhydride
- Acetic anhydride
- Acetic oxalic anhydride
