= OOCR =

OOCR may refer to:

- -OOCR, a functional group that identifies the Carboxylic acid anhydride family of organic compounds
- Open Optical Character Recognition, an open source optical character recognition project
