= C3H4O3 =

The molecular formula C_{3}H_{4}O_{3} (molar mass: 88.06 g/mol) may refer to:

- 3-Oxopropanoic acid
- Acetic formic anhydride
- Ethylene carbonate
- Glucic acid
- Glycidic acid
- Pyruvic acid
