= Formic anhydride =

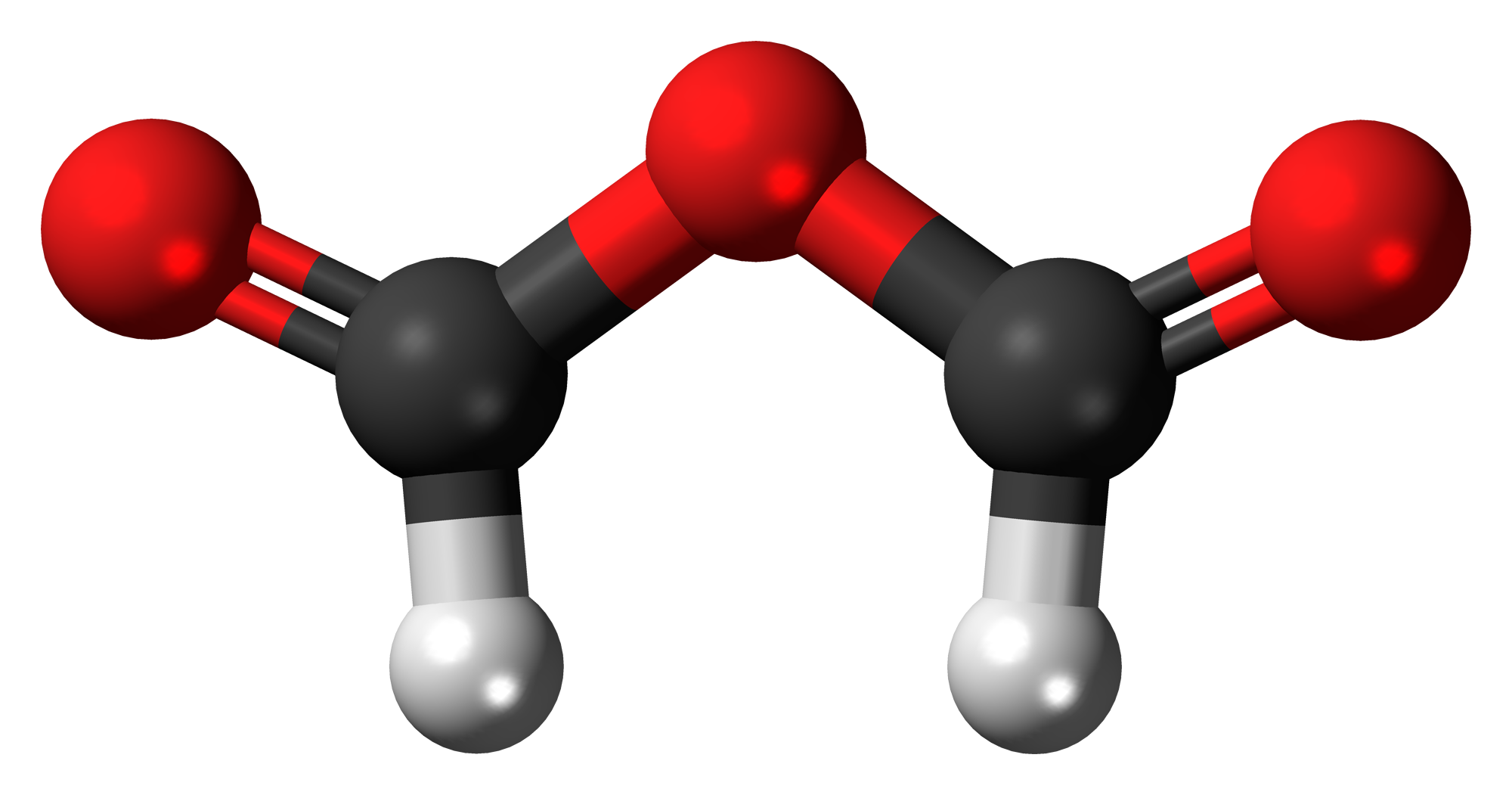

Names
- Preferred IUPAC name Formic anhydride
- Other names Methanoic anhydride Formyloxymethanone

Identifiers
CAS Number	1558-67-4
3D model (JSmol)	Interactive image
Beilstein Reference	1901016
ChEBI	CHEBI:36657
ChemSpider	7827603
Gmelin Reference	1041427
PubChem CID	9548680
UNII	DG7TRR6KVW
CompTox Dashboard (EPA)	DTXSID10429526
- InChI: InChI=1S/C2H2O3/c3-1-5-2-4/h1-2H Key: VGGRCVDNFAQIKO-UHFFFAOYSA-N
- SMILES: O=COC=O

Properties
Chemical formula	C_{2}H_{2}O_{3}
Molar mass	74.035 g·mol^{−1}
Appearance	Colorless gas
Boiling point	24 °C (75 °F; 297 K) at 20 mmHg
- Except where otherwise noted, data are given for materials in their standard state (at 25 °C [77 °F], 100 kPa). Infobox references

Formic anhydride, also called methanoic anhydride, is an organic compound with the chemical formula C_{2}H_{2}O_{3} and a structural formula of (H(C=O)−)_{2}O. It can be viewed as the anhydride of formic acid (HCOOH).

== Preparation ==
Formic anhydride can be obtained by reaction of formyl fluoride with excess sodium formate and a catalytic amount of formic acid in ether at −78 °C. It can also be produced by reacting formic acid with N,N′-dicyclohexylcarbodiimide ((C_{6}H_{11}−N=)_{2}C) in ether at −10 °C. It can also be obtained by disproportionation of acetic formic anhydride.

== Properties ==
Formic anhydride is a liquid with boiling point 24 °C at 20 mmHg. It is stable in diethyl ether solution. It can be isolated by low-temperature, low-pressure distillation, but decomposes on heating above room temperature. At room temperature and higher, it decomposes through a decarbonylation reaction into formic acid and carbon monoxide. Due to its instability, formic anhydride is not commercially available and must be prepared fresh and used promptly.

The decomposition of formic anhydride may be catalyzed by formic acid.

Formic anhydride can be detected in the gas-phase reaction of ozone with ethylene. The molecule is planar in the gas phase.

== See also ==
- Acetic formic anhydride
- Acetic anhydride
- Formaldehyde
