= C6H6O6 =

The molecular formula C_{6}H_{6}O_{6} (molar mass: 174.11 g/mol, exact mass: 174.0164 u) may refer to:

- Acetic oxalic anhydride
- Aconitic acid
- Benzenehexol
- Dehydroascorbic acid (DHA)
