= Basic oxide =

Oxide that shows basic properties

Basic oxides are oxides that show basic properties, in opposition to acidic oxides. A basic oxide can either react with water to form a base, or with an acid to form a salt and water in a neutralization reaction.

Examples include:

- Sodium oxide, which reacts with water to produce sodium hydroxide
- Magnesium oxide, which reacts with hydrochloric acid to form magnesium chloride
- Copper(II) oxide, which reacts with nitric acid to form copper nitrate

== Definition ==
An oxide is, a chemical compound in which one or more oxygen atoms combined with another element, such as H_{2}O or CO_{2}. Based on their acid-base characteristics, oxides can be classified into four categories: acidic oxides, basic oxides, and amphoteric oxides and neutral oxides.

A basic oxide, also called a base anhydride (meaning "base without water"), is usually formed in the reaction of oxygen with metals, especially alkali (group 1) and alkaline earth (group 2) metals. Both of these groups form ionic oxides that dissolve in water to form basic solutions of the corresponding metal hydroxide:

Alkali metals (Group 1)

X_{2}O + H_{2}O → 2XOH (X = group 1 element)

Alkaline earth metals (group 2)

XO + H_{2}O → X(OH)_{2} (X = group 2 element)

For instance, the basic oxide Li_{2}O becomes the hydroxide LiOH, and BaO becomes Ba(OH)_{2} after reacting with water. In contrast, non-metals usually form acidic oxides. In general, the basicity of oxides increases when towards the lower-left corner of the periodic table, which corresponds to increased metallic properties.

== Examples ==
- All oxides of group 1 & 2 elements are basic (except BeO), they react with water to form a base:
  - Lithium oxide reacts with water to produce lithium hydroxide: Li_{2}O + H_{2}O → 2 LiOH
  - Sodium oxide reacts with water to produce sodium hydroxide: Na_{2}O + H_{2}O → 2 NaOH
  - Potassium oxide reacts with water to produce potassium hydroxide: K_{2}O + H_{2}O → 2 KOH
  - Rubidium oxide reacts with water to produce rubidium hydroxide: Rb_{2}O + H_{2}O → 2 RbOH
  - Caesium oxide reacts with water to produce caesium hydroxide: Cs_{2}O + H_{2}O → 2 CsOH
  - Magnesium oxide reacts with water to produce magnesium hydroxide: MgO + H_{2}O → Mg(OH)_{2}
  - Calcium oxide reacts with water to produce calcium hydroxide: CaO + H_{2}O → Ca(OH)_{2}
  - Strontium oxide reacts with water to produce strontium hydroxide: SrO + H_{2}O → Sr(OH)_{2}
  - Barium oxide reacts with water to produce barium hydroxide: BaO + H_{2}O → Ba(OH)_{2}
  - Radium oxide reacts with water to produce radium hydroxide: RaO + H_{2}O → Ra(OH)_{2}
- Some oxides of other main group elements are basic, reacting with water to form a base:
  - Thallium(I) oxide, a group 13 oxide, reacts with water to produce thallium(I) hydroxide: Tl_{2}O + H_{2}O → 2 TlOH
  - Bismuth(III) oxide, a group 15 oxide, reacts with water to produce bismuth(III) hydroxide: Bi_{2}O_{3} + 3H_{2}O → 2 Bi(OH)_{3}
- In neutralization reactions, basic oxides reacts with an acid to form salt and water:
  - Magnesium oxide reacts with hydrogen chloride (acid) to produce magnesium chloride (salt) and water: MgO + 2 HCl → MgCl_{2} + H_{2}O
  - Sodium oxide reacts with hydrogen chloride (acid) to produce sodium chloride (salt) and water: Na_{2}O + 2 HCl → 2 NaCl + H_{2}O
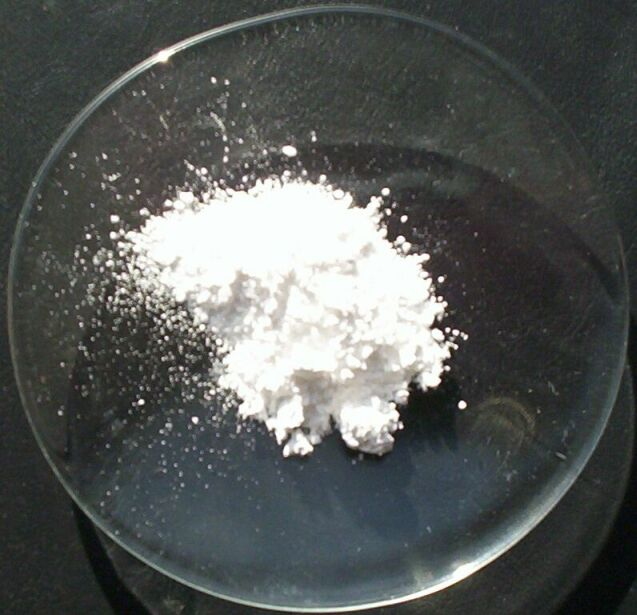
Magnesium oxide

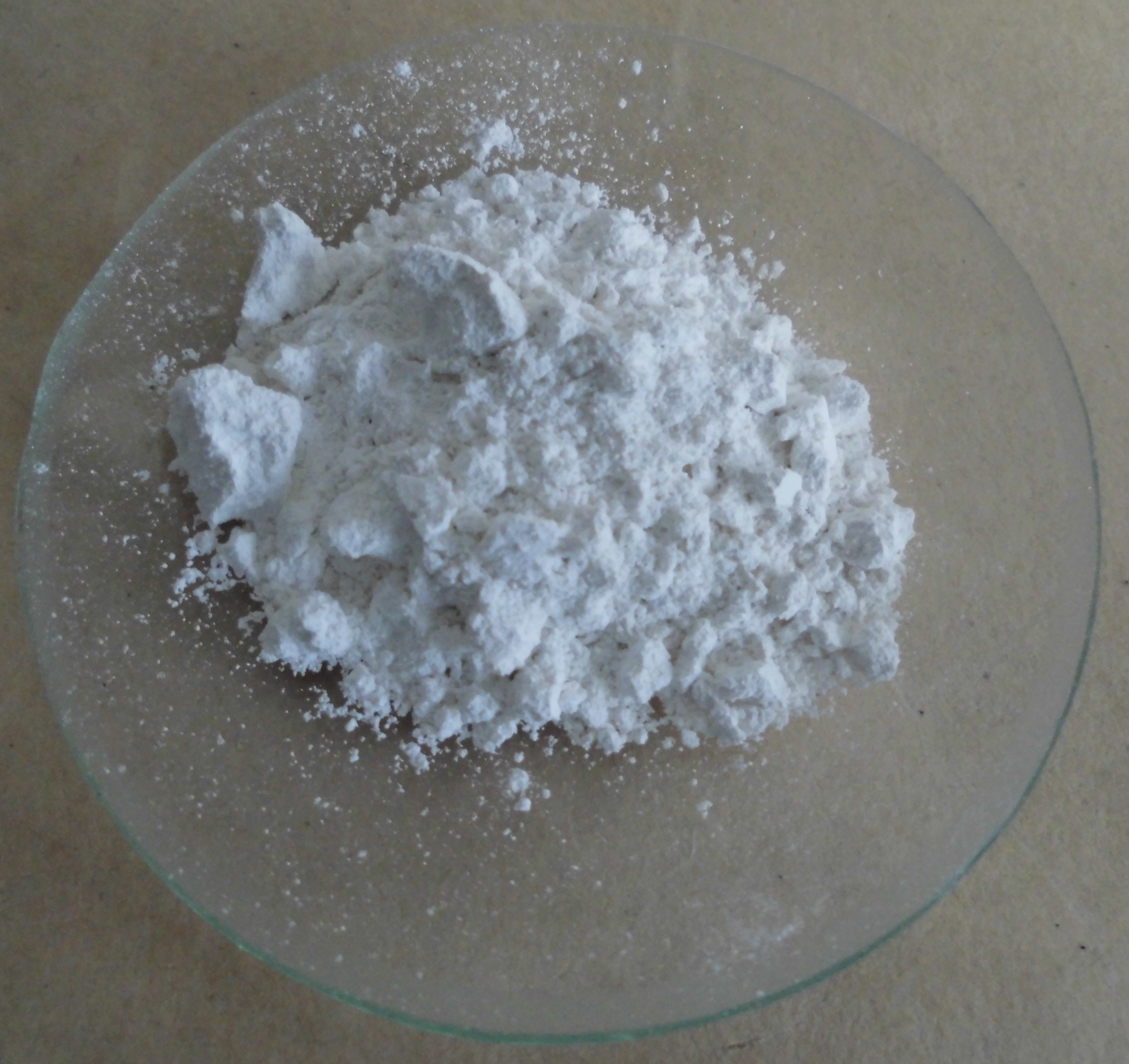
Calcium oxide

== See also ==
- Acidic oxide
- Amphoteric oxide
