= C2H2O3 =

The molecular formula C_{2}H_{2}O_{3} (molar mass: 74.04 g/mol, exact mass: 74.0004 u) may refer to:

- Formic anhydride, or methanoic anhydride
- Glyoxylic acid, or oxoacetic acid
