= Anhydrous =

Waterless substance

A substance is anhydrous if it contains no water. Many processes in chemistry can be impeded by the presence of water; therefore, it is important that water-free reagents and techniques are used. In practice, however, it is very difficult to achieve perfect dryness; anhydrous compounds gradually absorb water from the atmosphere so they must be stored carefully.

Substances that contain water or its constituent elements are called hydrates.

== Solids ==
Many salts and solids can be dried using heat, or under vacuum. Desiccators can also be used to store reagents in dry conditions.

Common desiccants include phosphorus pentoxide and silica gel. Chemists may also require dry glassware for sensitive reactions. This can be achieved by drying glassware in an oven, by flame, or under vacuum.

Dry solids can be produced by freeze-drying, which is also known as lyophilization.

== Liquids or solvents ==
In many cases, the presence of water can prevent a reaction from happening, or cause undesirable products to form. To prevent this, anhydrous solvents must be used when performing certain reactions. Examples of reactions requiring the use of anhydrous solvents are the Grignard reaction and the Wurtz reaction.

Solvents have typically been dried using distillation or by reaction with reactive metals or metal hydrides. These methods can be dangerous and are a common cause of lab fires. More modern techniques include the use of molecular sieves or a column purification system. Molecular sieves are far more effective than most common methods for drying solvents and are safer and require no special equipment for handling. Column solvent purification devices (generally referred to as Grubb's columns) recently became available, reducing the hazards (water reactive substances, heat) from the classical dehydrating methods.

Anhydrous solvents are commercially available from chemical suppliers, and are packaged in sealed containers to maintain dryness. Typically anhydrous solvents will contain approximately 10 ppm of water and will increase in wetness if they are not properly stored.

Organic solutions can be dried using a range of drying agents. Typically following a workup the organic extract is dried using magnesium sulfate or a similar drying agent to remove most remaining water.

Anhydrous acetic acid is known as glacial acetic acid.

== Gases ==
Several substances that exist as gases at standard conditions of temperature and pressure are commonly used as concentrated aqueous solutions. To clarify that it is the gaseous form that is being referred to, the term anhydrous is prefixed to the name of the substance:

- Gaseous ammonia is generally referred to as anhydrous ammonia, to distinguish it from its solution in water, household ammonia solution, also known as ammonium hydroxide.
- Gaseous hydrogen chloride is generally referred to as anhydrous, to distinguish it from its solution in water, hydrochloric acid.

Reactions which produce water can be kept dry using a Dean–Stark apparatus.

== See also ==
- Air-free technique – Chemistry laboratory technique
- Acidic oxide – Type of oxide, a.k.a. acid anhydride
- Base anhydride – Oxide of a chemical element from alkali- or alkaline earth metals
- Hydrate – Substance containing water or its constituent elements
