= 3,3',4,4'-Benzophenone tetracarboxylic dianhydride =

Names
- Preferred IUPAC name 5,5′-Carbonyldi(2-benzofuran-1,3-dione)
- Other names: 4,4′-Carbonyldiphthalic anhydride; 1,3-Isobenzofurandione, 5,5′-carbonylbis-; Benzophenonetetracarboxylic acid dianhydride; 4,4′-Diphthalic anhydride ketone

Identifiers
CAS Number	2421-28-5
3D model (JSmol)	Interactive image
Abbreviations	BTDA
ChEMBL	ChEMBL3183537
ChemSpider	68027
ECHA InfoCard	100.017.590
EC Number	219-348-1
PubChem CID	75498
UNII	Y61GVA8097
CompTox Dashboard (EPA)	DTXSID3029233
- InChI: InChI=1S/C17H6O7/c18-13(7-1-3-9-11(5-7)16(21)23-14(9)19)8-2-4-10-12(6-8)17(22)24-15(10)20/h1-6H Key: VQVIHDPBMFABCQ-UHFFFAOYSA-N
- SMILES: C1=CC2=C(C=C1C(=O)C3=CC4=C(C=C3)C(=O)OC4=O)C(=O)OC2=O

Properties
Chemical formula	C_{17}H_{6}O_{7}
Molar mass	322.228 g·mol^{−1}
Melting point	218–222 °C (424–432 °F; 491–495 K)

Hazards
- GHS labelling
Pictograms	(GHS07: Exclamation mark)
Signal word	Warning
Hazard statements	H319: Causes serious eye irritation.; H335: May cause respiratory irritation.
Precautionary statements	P261: Avoid breathing dust/fume/gas/mist/vapours/spray.; P264: Wash hands [and ...] thoroughly after handling.; P271: Use only outdoors or with adequate ventilation.; P280: Wear protective gloves/protective clothing/eye protection/face protection/hearing protection/...; P304+P340+P312: (Obsolete) IF INHALED: Remove victim to fresh air and keep at rest in a position comfortable for breathing. Call a POISON CENTER or doctor/physician if you feel unwell.; P305+P351+P338: IF IN EYES: Rinse continuously with water for several minutes. Remove contact lenses, if present and easy to do. Continue rinsing.; P337+P313: (Obsolete) If eye irritation persists: Get medical advice/attention.; P403+P233: Store in a well-ventilated place. Keep container tightly closed.; P405: Store locked up.; P501: Dispose of contents/container to ...
- Except where otherwise noted, data are given for materials in their standard state (at 25 °C [77 °F], 100 kPa). Infobox references

3,3’,4,4’-Benzophenone tetracarboxylic dianhydride (BTDA) is, chemically, an aromatic organic acid dianhydride.

== Uses ==
Its use in epoxy powder coatings is slightly unusual in that many epoxy coatings are designed to be fairly close to a stoichiometric curing ratio. BTDA cured materials benefit from having the stoichiometry closer to 0.65 rather than 1. It is also used to synthesize polyimides. These have good flexibility because of the carbonyl and keto groups which increase the molecular distancing between the imide rings. This improves the solubility. The resultant product when combined with nano-technology produces composites with enhanced heat stability properties.

== Safety ==
It is REACH and TSCA registered. Exposure causes serious eye irritation and may cause respiratory irritation.

== Trademark ==
The name BTDA is a registered trademark of company Jayhawk Fine Chemicals Corporation.
