= Formyl fluoride =

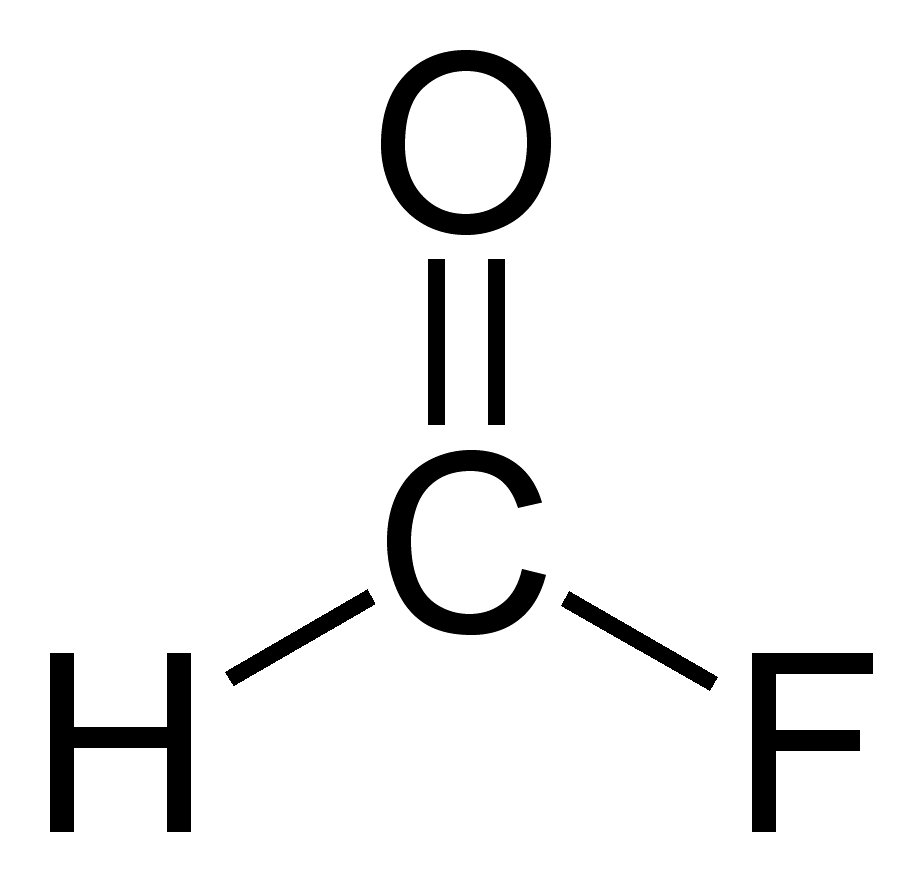
Formyl fluoride
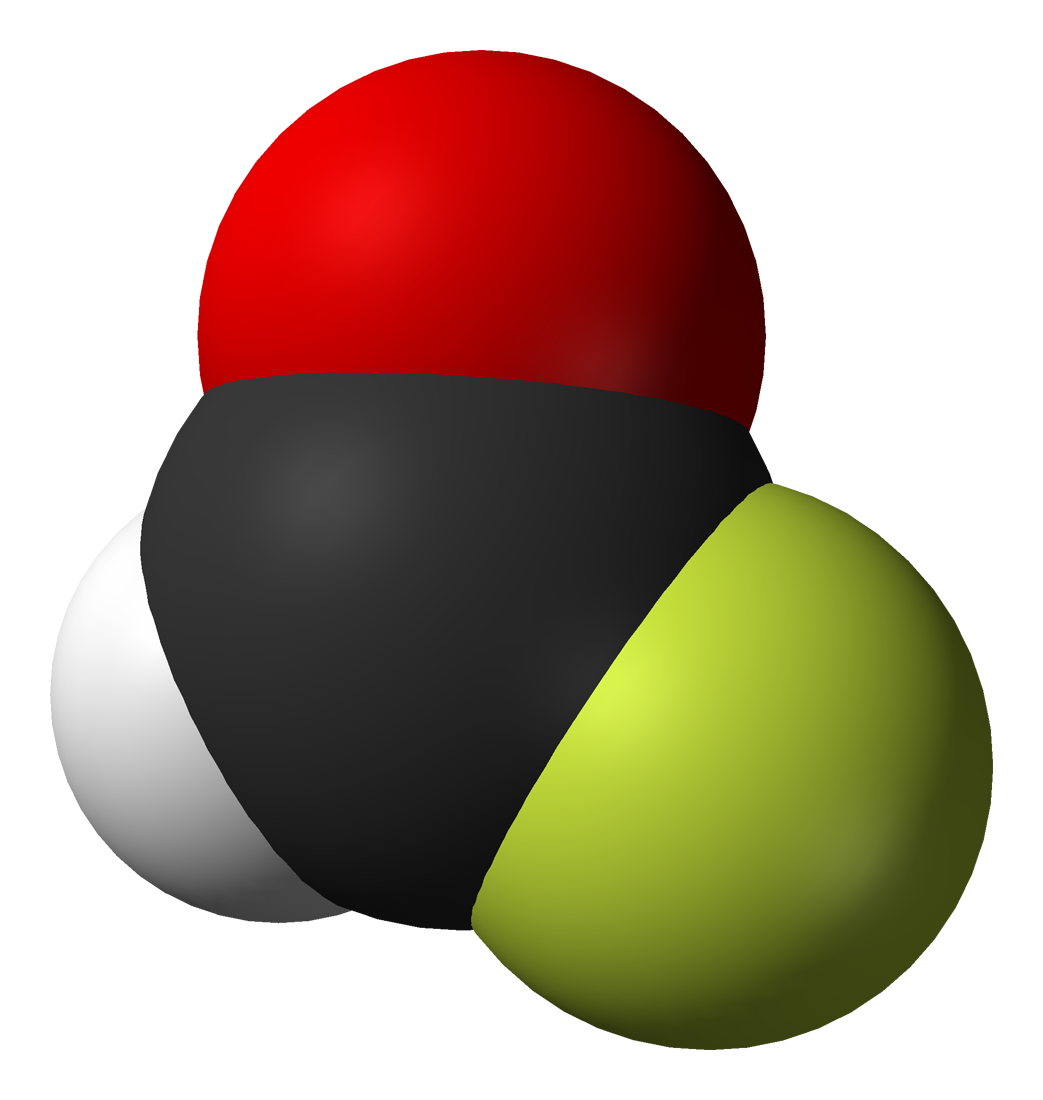
Formyl fluoride

Names
- Preferred IUPAC name Formyl fluoride
- Other names Formic acid fluoride Methanoyl fluoride

Identifiers
CAS Number	1493-02-3
3D model (JSmol)	Interactive image
ChemSpider	14424
PubChem CID	15153
UNII	0UY0U66165
CompTox Dashboard (EPA)	DTXSID6073946
- InChI: InChI=1S/CHFO/c2-1-3/h1H Key: NHGVZTMBVDFPHJ-UHFFFAOYSA-N; InChI=1/CHFO/c2-1-3/h1H Key: NHGVZTMBVDFPHJ-UHFFFAOYAX
- SMILES: FC=O

Properties
Chemical formula	CHFO
Molar mass	48.016 g·mol^{−1}
Appearance	Colorless gas
Melting point	−142 °C (−224 °F; 131 K)
Boiling point	−29 °C (−20 °F; 244 K)
Solubility in water	Decomposes
Solubility in other solvents	Chlorocarbons, Freons

Structure
Dipole moment	2.02 D

Hazards
- Occupational safety and health (OHS/OSH)
Main hazards	toxic

Related compounds
Related compounds	Formic acid Hydrogen fluoride Carbonyl fluoride
- Except where otherwise noted, data are given for materials in their standard state (at 25 °C [77 °F], 100 kPa). verify (what is ?) Infobox references

Formyl fluoride is the organic compound with the formula HC(O)F.

== Preparation ==
HC(O)F was first reported in 1934. Among the many preparations, a typical one involves the reaction of sodium formate with benzoyl fluoride (generated in situ from KHF_{2} and benzoyl chloride):

HCOONa + C_{6}H_{5}C(O)F → FC(O)H + C_{6}H_{5}COONa

== Structure ==
The molecule is planar; C-O and C-F distances are 1.18 and 1.34 A, respectively.

== Reactions ==
HC(O)F decomposes autocatalytically near room temperature to carbon monoxide and hydrogen fluoride:

HC(O)F → HF + CO

Because of the compound's sensitivity, reactions are conducted at low temperatures and samples are often stored over anhydrous alkali metal fluorides, e.g. potassium fluoride which absorbs HF.

Benzene (and other arenes) react with formyl fluoride in the presence of boron trifluoride to give benzaldehyde. In a related reaction, formyl chloride is implicated in Gattermann-Koch formylation reaction. The reaction of formyl fluoride/BF_{3} with perdeuteriobenzene (C_{6}D_{6}) exhibits a kinetic isotope effect of 2.68, similar to the isotope effect observed in Friedel-Crafts acetylation of benzene. Formylation of benzene with a mixture of CO and hexafluoroantimonic acid however, exhibits no isotope effect (C_{6}H_{6} and C_{6}D_{6} react at the same rate), indicating that this reaction involves a more reactive formylating agent, possibly CHO^{+}.

Formyl fluoride undergoes the reactions expected of an acyl halide: alcohols and carboxylic acids are converted to formate esters and mixed acid anhydrides, respectively.
