= Permanganic acid =

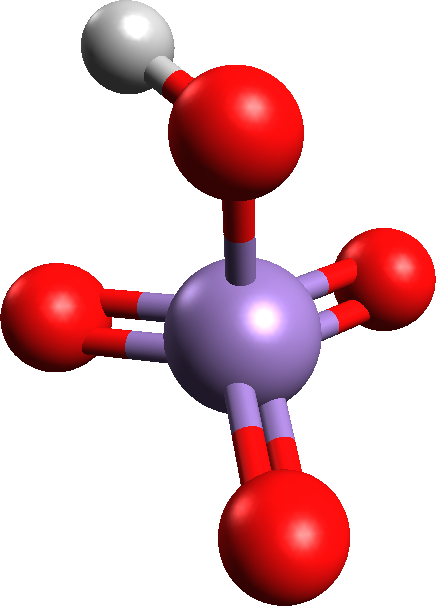
- Permanganic acid

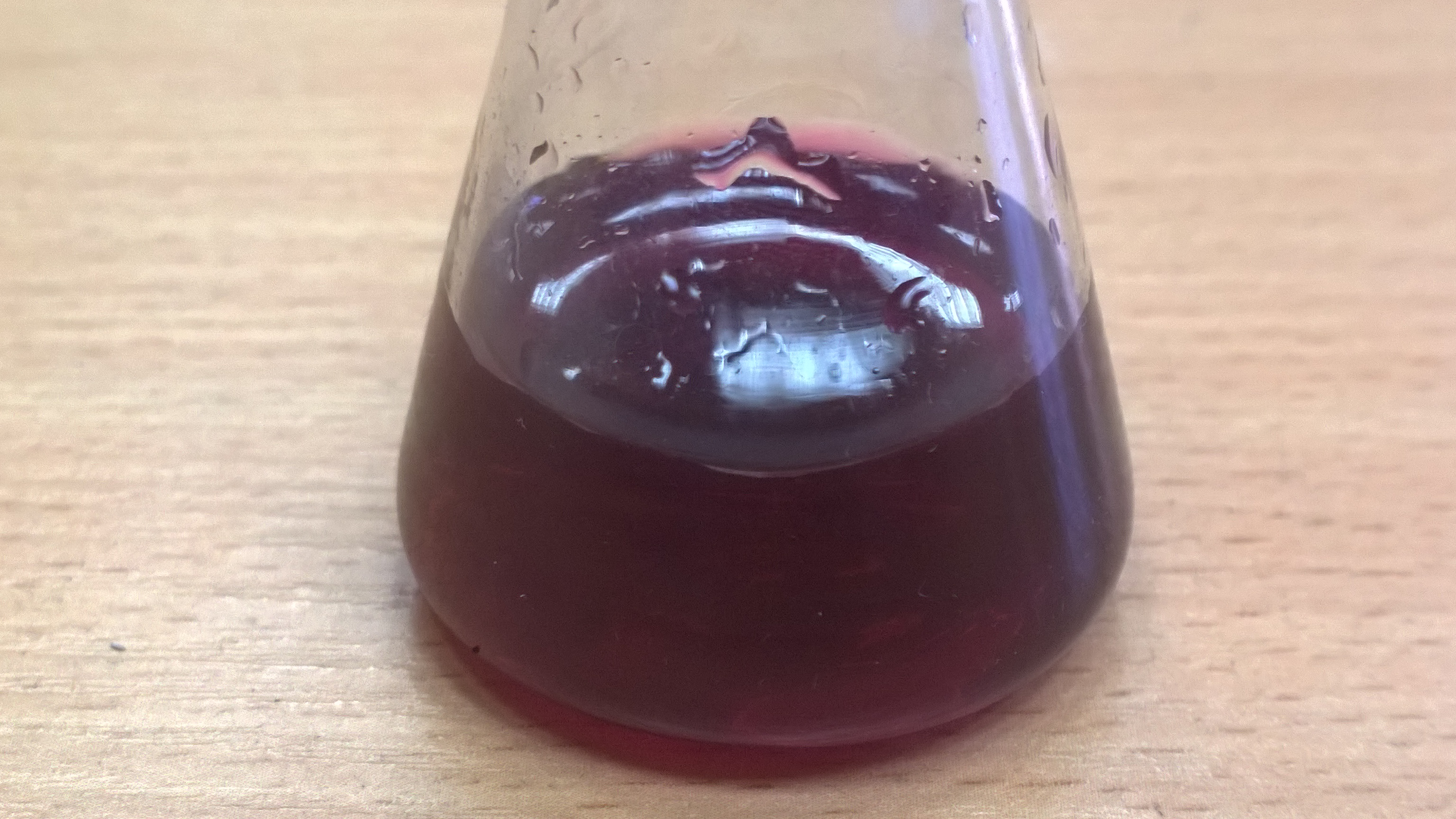

Names
- IUPAC name Permanganic acid
- Other names Manganic(VII) acid Hydroxy(trioxo)manganese; Hydrogen permanganate

Identifiers
CAS Number	13465-41-3; 24653-70-1 (dihydrate)
3D model (JSmol)	Interactive image
ChemSpider	374116
ECHA InfoCard	100.033.346
EC Number	236-695-4
PubChem CID	422689
CompTox Dashboard (EPA)	DTXSID40920531
- InChI: InChI=1S/Mn.H2O.3O/h;1H2;;;/q+1;;;;/p-1 Key: ZJBYBXHCMWGGRR-UHFFFAOYSA-M
- SMILES: O=[Mn](=O)(=O)O

Properties
Chemical formula	HMnO_{4}
Molar mass	119.94 g mol^{−1}
Appearance	Violet
Acidity (pK_{a})	−4.6 to −2.3
Conjugate base	Permanganate

Hazards
- Occupational safety and health (OHS/OSH)
Main hazards	Oxidant, Corrosive

Related compounds
Other cations	Potassium permanganate Sodium permanganate Calcium permanganate
Related compounds	Pertechnetic acid Perrhenic acid Perchloric acid
- Except where otherwise noted, data are given for materials in their standard state (at 25 °C [77 °F], 100 kPa). Infobox references

Permanganic acid (or manganic(VII) acid) is the inorganic compound with the formula HMnO_{4} and various hydrates. This strong oxoacid has been isolated as its dihydrate. It is the conjugate acid of permanganate salts. It is the subject of few publications and its characterization as well as its uses are very limited.

== Preparation and structure ==
Permanganic acid is most often prepared by the reaction of dilute sulfuric acid with a solution of barium permanganate, the insoluble barium sulfate byproduct being removed by filtering:

Ba(MnO_{4})_{2} + H_{2}SO_{4} → 2 HMnO_{4} + BaSO_{4}↓

The sulfuric acid used must be dilute; reactions of permanganates with concentrated sulfuric acid yield the anhydride, manganese heptoxide.

Permanganic acid has also been prepared through the reaction of hydrofluorosilicic acid with potassium permanganate, through electrolysis, and through hydrolysis of manganese heptoxide, though the last route often results in explosions.

Crystalline permanganic acid has been prepared at low temperatures as the dihydrate, HMnO_{4}·2H_{2}O.

Although its structure has not been verified spectroscopically or crystallographically, HMnO_{4} is assumed to adopt a tetrahedral structure akin to that for perchloric acid.

== Reactions ==
As a strong acid, HMnO_{4} is deprotonated to form the intensely purple coloured permanganates. Potassium permanganate, KMnO_{4}, is a widely used, versatile and powerful oxidising agent.

Permanganic acid solutions are unstable, and gradually decompose into manganese dioxide, oxygen, and water, with initially formed manganese dioxide catalyzing further decomposition. Decomposition is accelerated by heat, light, and acids. Concentrated solutions decompose more rapidly than dilute.
