= Tautomycetin =

Polyketide antibiotic

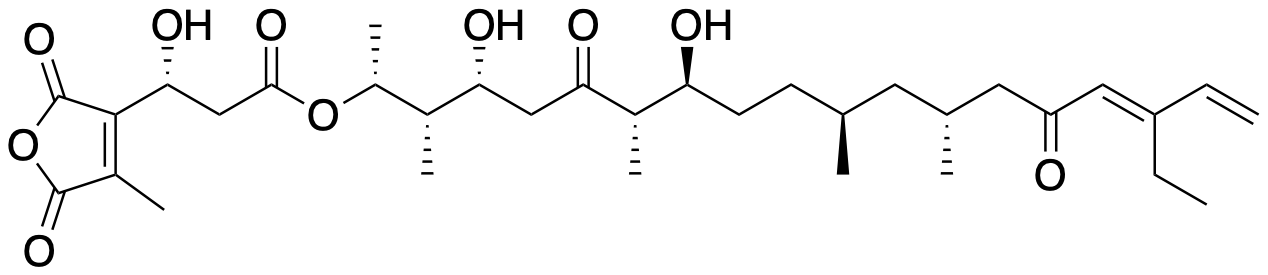
- Structure of Tautomycetin

Identifiers
- IUPAC name: (3R,4R,5R,8S,9S,12R)-12-{(2S,3S,6R,8S,9R)-3,9-Dimethyl-8-[(3S)-3-methyl-4-oxopentyl]-1,7-dioxaspiro[5.5]undecan-2-yl}-5,9-dihydroxy-4-methoxy-2,8-dimethyl-7-oxotridecan-3-yl (3R)-3-hydroxy-3-(4-methyl-2,5-dioxo-2,5-dihydrofuran-3-yl)propanoate
- CAS Number: 119757-73-2
- PubChem CID: 16759609
- ChemSpider: 24832016
- ChEMBL: ChEMBL539446

Chemical and physical data
- Formula: C_{33}H_{50}O_{10}
- Molar mass: 606.753 g·mol^{−1}
- 3D model (JSmol): Interactive image
- SMILES: CCC(=CC(=O)CC(C)CC(C)CCC(C(C)C(=O)CC(C(C)C(C)OC(=O)CC(C1=C(C(=O)OC1=O)C)O)O)O)C=C
- InChI: InChI=S/C33H50O10/c1-9-24(10-2)15-25(34)14-19(4)13-18(3)11-12-26(35)21(6)28(37)16-27(36)20(5)23(8)42-30(39)17-29(38)31-22(7)32(40)43-33(31)41/h9,15,18-21,23,26-27,29,35-36,38H,1,10-14,16-17H2,2-8H3/b24-15-; Key:VAIBGAONSFVVKI-IWIPYMOSSA-N

Tautomycetin is a natural product first isolated from Streptomyces griseochromogenes, a bacterium found in the soil of the Zhejiang Province, China. It was also later found in Penicillium urticae. It is a linear polyketide very similar in structure to tautomycin, both of which contain a unique dialkylmaleic anhydride moiety, which is essential for their pharmacological activity. Tautomycetin is a selective inhibitor of protein phosphatase 1.

== Biosynthesis ==
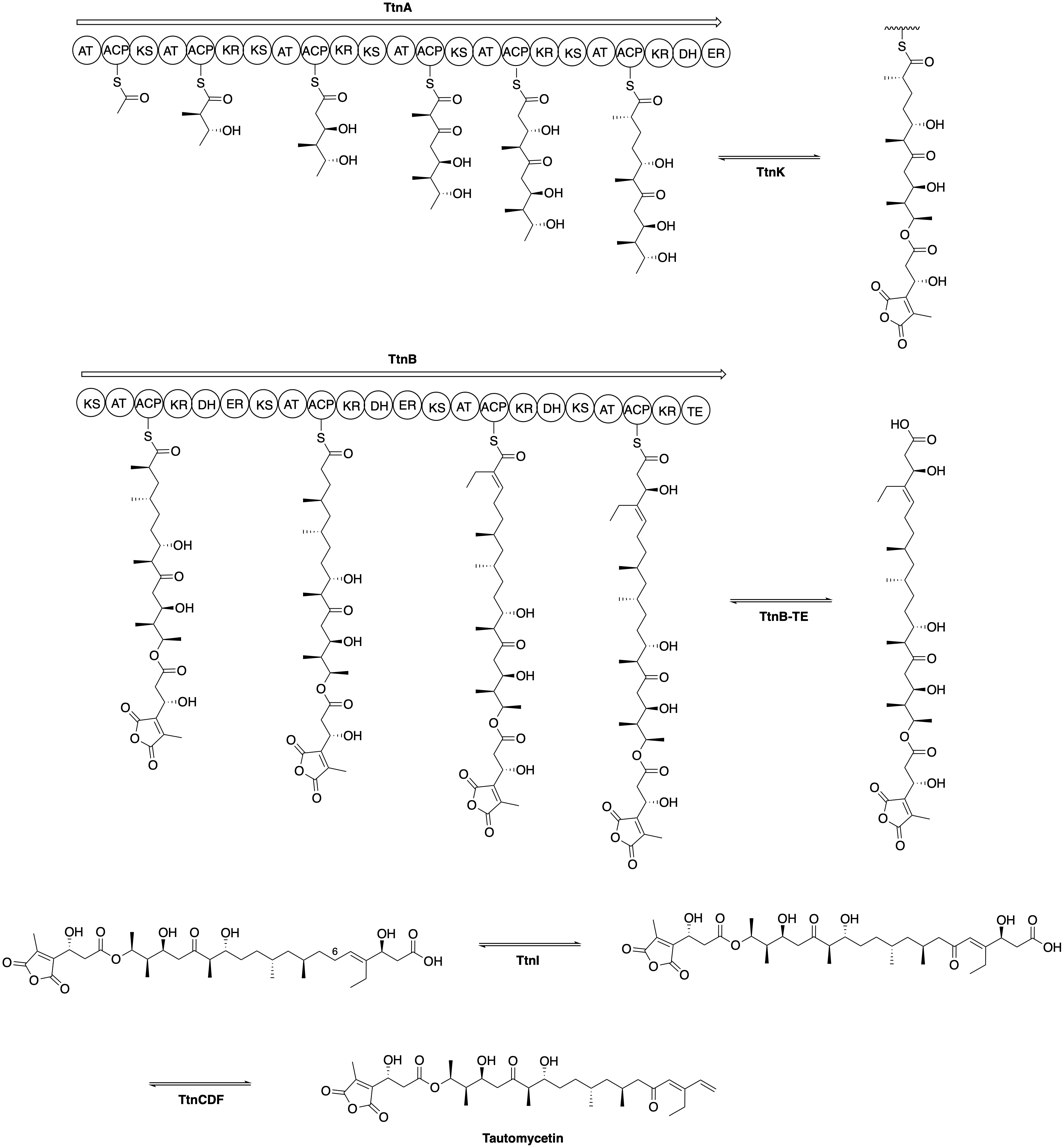
Biosynthesis of Tautomycetin

Much of the biosynthesis of tautomycetin has been deduced. It is synthesized in S. griseochromogenes by two type I polyketide synthases, denoted by modules named TtnA and TtnB. After initial loading with acetyl-CoA, four methylmalonyl-CoAs and three malonyl-CoAs are added alternately by sequential Claisen condensation, followed by one ethylmalonyl-CoA. Each ketone of the incorporated acetate group is selectively modified by a ketoreductase (KR), dehydratase (DH), or enoylreductase (ER) as indicated. The dialkyl maleic anhydride moeity is synthesized separately by eight enzymes (TtnKLMNOPRS) and incorporated into the growing polyketide by esterification mediated via TtnK at the end of TtnA. The polyketide is released from TtnB, by a thioesterase TtnB-TE and undergoes oxidation at the C6 position, catalyzed by the enzyme TtnI. Finally, this intermediate undergoes an enzyme-catalyzed decarboxylation-dehydration to form the final compound, tautomycetin.

The total synthesis of tautomycetin has been reported.

== Pharmacology ==
Tautomycetin has been shown to have antibiotic and antifungal activities. It has also been identified as a potent protein phosphatase 1 (PP1) and protein phosphatase 2A (PP2A) inhibitor with IC50 values as low as 0.21 nM and 0.94 nM respectively, the lowest of over 40 natural product phosphatase inhibitors. In addition, tautomycetin is a potent T cell-specific immunosuppressor and has been investigated for treatment in grafting and transplantation. It has useful anticancer properties, inducing apoptosis through the inhibition of several protein cascades in colorectal cancer and thyroid cancer.
