= Acetic oxalic anhydride =

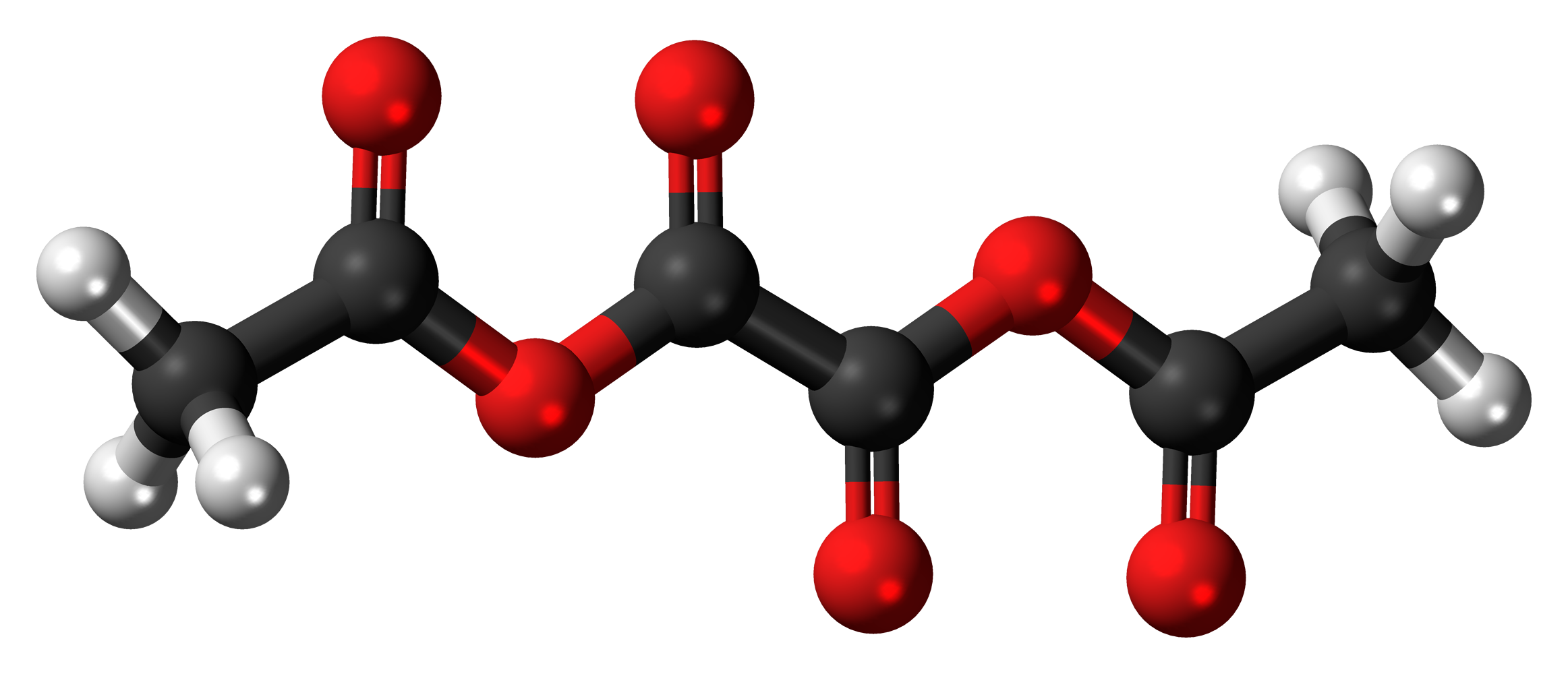

Names
- Preferred IUPAC name Diacetic oxalic dianhydride
- Other names Diacetyl oxalate

Identifiers
CAS Number	19037-85-5
3D model (JSmol)	Interactive image
ChemSpider	25991421
PubChem CID	54484691
UNII	B7JR77WDN2
CompTox Dashboard (EPA)	DTXSID20711666
- InChI: InChI=1S/C6H6O6/c1-3(7)11-5(9)6(10)12-4(2)8/h1-2H3 Key: XRMBFFGBVGXJJF-UHFFFAOYSA-N
- SMILES: CC(OC(C(OC(C)=O)=O)=O)=O

Properties
Chemical formula	C_{6}H_{6}O_{6}
Molar mass	174.108 g·mol^{−1}
- Except where otherwise noted, data are given for materials in their standard state (at 25 °C [77 °F], 100 kPa). verify (what is ?) Infobox references

Acetic oxalic anhydride is an organic compound with a chemical formula of C_{6}H_{6}O_{6} and a structural formula of (H_{3}C-(C=O)-O-(C=O)-)_{2}. It can be viewed as a mixed anhydride, formally derived from acetic acid (H_{3}C-(C=O)OH) and oxalic acid ((-(C=O)OH)_{2}), in 2:1 molecular ratio, by the loss of two water molecules.

== Preparation ==
Unlike some other anhydrides, Acetic oxalic anhydride cannot be obtained directly from the acids. It was synthesized in 1953 by W. Edwards and W. M. Henley, by reacting silver oxalate (Ag_{2}C_{2}O_{4}) suspended in diethyl ether with acetyl chloride at temperatures below −5 °C and distilling off the solvent under low pressure. It can also be obtained by reacting anhydrous oxalic acid with ketene (H_{2}C=C=O).

== Properties ==
Acetic oxalic anhydride is an unstable colorless crystalline solid, soluble in diethyl ether, that decomposes at about −3 °C into acetic anhydride (H_{3}C-(C=O)-)_{2}O, carbon dioxide (CO_{2}) and carbon monoxide (CO). It is hydrolyzed by water into acetic and oxalic acids.

Acetic oxalic anhydride was conjectured to be an intermediate in the decomposition of anhydrous oxalic acid by acetic anhydride.

== See also ==
- Oxalic anhydride
