= Streptomyces spiroverticillatus =

Scientific classification
- Domain: Bacteria
- Kingdom: Bacillati
- Phylum: Actinomycetota
- Class: Actinomycetes
- Order: Streptomycetales
- Family: Streptomycetaceae
- Genus: Streptomyces
- Species: S. spiroverticillatus

Binomial name
- Streptomyces spiroverticillatus Shinobu 1958

Type strain
- 507, AS 4.1749, ATCC 19811, BCRC 13648, CBS 564.68, CCRC 13648, CGMCC 4.1749, DSM 40036, ETH 24485, IFO 12821, IFO 3728, IFO 3931, IMET 42050, IPV 1829, IPV 989, ISP 5036, JCM 4104, JCM 4609, KCC S-0104, NBIMCC 3604, NBRC 12821, NBRC 3728, NBRC 3931, NRRL B-2259, NRRL B-5483, NRRL B-B-5483, NRRL-ISP 5036, OEU 508, R. Shinobu 508, RIA 1091, RIA 549 T, Shinobu 508, Shinobu OEU 508, UNIQEM 198, VKM Ac-751, VTT E-052932

Species of bacterium

Streptomyces spiroverticillatus is a bacterium species from the genus of Streptomyces which has been isolated from soil in Japan. Streptomyces spiroverticillatus produces tautomycin.

== See also ==
- List of Streptomyces species
