= Acidic oxide =

Type of oxide

An acidic oxide is an oxide that either produces an acidic solution upon addition to water, or acts as an acceptor of hydroxide ions effectively functioning as a Lewis acid. Acidic oxides will typically have a low pK_{a} and may be inorganic or organic. A commonly encountered acidic oxide, carbon dioxide produces an acidic solution (and the generation of carbonic acid) when dissolved. Generally non-metallic oxides are acidic.

The acidity of an oxide can be reasonably assumed by its accompanying constituents. Less electronegative elements tend to form basic oxides such as sodium oxide and magnesium oxide, whereas more electronegative elements tend to produce acidic oxides such as carbon dioxide and phosphorus pentoxide. Some oxides, like aluminium oxides, are amphoteric, while some oxides may be neutral.

Acidic oxides are of environmental concern. Sulfur and nitrogen oxides are considered air pollutants as they react with atmospheric water vapour to produce acid rain.

== Examples ==
Carbonic acid is an illustrative example of the Lewis acidity of an acidic oxide.

CO_{2} + 2OH^{−} ⇌ HCO_{3}^{−} + OH^{−} ⇌ CO_{3}^{2−} + H_{2}O

This property is a key reason for keeping alkali chemicals well sealed from the atmosphere, as long-term exposure to carbon dioxide in the air can degrade the material.

- Carbon dioxide is also the anhydride of carbonic acid:

H_{2}CO_{3} → H_{2}O + CO_{2}

- Chromium trioxide, which reacts with water forming chromic acid:

CrO_{3} + H_{2}O → H_{2}CrO_{4}

- Dinitrogen pentoxide, which reacts with water forming nitric acid:

N_{2}O_{5} + H_{2}O → 2 HNO_{3}

- Manganese heptoxide, which reacts with water forming permanganic acid:

Mn_{2}O_{7} + H_{2}O → 2 HMnO_{4}

== Further examples ==
=== Aluminium oxide ===
Aluminium oxide (Al_{2}O_{3}) is an amphoteric oxide; it can act as a base or acid. For example, with base different aluminate salts will be formed:

Al_{2}O_{3} + 2 NaOH + 3 H_{2}O → 2 NaAl(OH)_{4}

=== Silicon dioxide ===
Silicon dioxide is an acidic oxide. It will react with strong bases to form silicate salts.

Silicon dioxide is the anhydride of silicic acid:

H_{4}SiO_{4} → 2 H_{2}O + SiO_{2}

=== Phosphorus oxides ===
Phosphorus(III) oxide reacts to form phosphorous acid in water:

P_{4}O_{6} + 6 H_{2}O → 4 H_{3}PO_{3}

Phosphorus(V) oxide reacts with water to give phosphoric acid:

P_{4}O_{10} + 6 H_{2}O → 4 H_{3}PO_{4}

=== Sulfur oxides ===
Sulfur dioxide reacts with water to form the weak acid, sulfurous acid:

SO_{2} + H_{2}O → H_{2}SO_{3}

Sulfur trioxide forms the strong acid sulfuric acid with water:

SO_{3} + H_{2}O → H_{2}SO_{4}

This reaction is important in the manufacturing of sulfuric acid.

=== Chlorine oxides ===
Chlorine(I) oxide reacts with water to form hypochlorous acid, a very weak acid:

Cl_{2}O + H_{2}O ⇌ 2 HOCl

Chlorine(VII) oxide reacts with water to form perchloric acid, a strong acid:

Cl_{2}O_{7} + H_{2}O → 2 HClO_{4}

=== Iron oxides ===
Iron(II) oxide is the anhydride of the aqueous ferrous ion:

[Fe(H_{2}O)_{6}]^{2+} → FeO + 2 H^{+} + 5 H_{2}O

=== Chromium oxides ===
Chromium trioxide is the anhydride of chromic acid:

H_{2}CrO_{4} → H_{2}O + CrO_{3}

=== Vanadium oxides ===
Vanadium trioxide is the anhydride of vanadous acid:

2H_{3}VO_{3} → 3H_{2}O + V_{2}O_{3}

Vanadium pentoxide is the anhydride of vanadic acid:

2H_{3}VO_{4} → 3H_{2}O + V_{2}O_{5}

== See also ==
- Organic acid anhydride, similar compounds in organic chemistry
- Base anhydride
