= Magnesium permanganate =

Identifiers
CAS Number	anhydrous: 10377-62-5; hexahydrate: 13446-20-3
3D model (JSmol)	anhydrous: Interactive image; hexahydrate: Interactive image
ChemSpider	anhydrous: 9732758
ECHA InfoCard	100.030.740
EC Number	anhydrous: 233-827-2
PubChem CID	anhydrous: 11557984
UNII	anhydrous: 279I24X1X1
CompTox Dashboard (EPA)	anhydrous: DTXSID90146047
- InChI: InChI=1S/Mg.2Mn.8O/q+2;;;;;;;;;2*-1 Key: NQCAHSNYYAIAQM-UHFFFAOYSA-N
- SMILES: anhydrous: [Mg+2].O=[Mn](=O)(=O)[O-].O=[Mn](=O)(=O)[O-]; hexahydrate: [O-][Mn](=O)(=O)=O.[O-][Mn](=O)(=O)=O.[Mg+2].O.O.O.O.O.O

Properties
Chemical formula	Mg(MnO_{4})_{2}
Solubility in water	soluble
- Except where otherwise noted, data are given for materials in their standard state (at 25 °C [77 °F], 100 kPa). Infobox references

Magnesium permanganate is an inorganic compound with the chemical formula Mg(MnO_{4})_{2}. It can be used as an oxidant.

== Preparation ==
Magnesium permanganate hexahydrate was prepared by E. Mitserlich and H. Aschoff by reacting barium permanganate with magnesium sulfate:

MgSO_{4} + Ba(MnO_{4})_{2} → Mg(MnO_{4})_{2} + BaSO_{4}

It can be obtained by the reaction of magnesium chloride and silver permanganate:

MgCl_{2} + 2AgMnO_{4} → Mg(MnO_{4})_{2} + 2AgCl

The hexahydrate Mg(MnO_{4})_{2}·6H_{2}O can be crystallized from the solution, which is slightly hygroscopic. The anhydrous form can be obtained by decomposing the hexahydrate by heating it.

== Chemical properties ==
Magnesium permanganate hexahydrate is a blue-black solid. It decomposes at 130 °C with the evolution of oxygen in an autocatalytic decomposition process. The tetrahydrate decomposes above 150 °C. The crystals are practically insoluble in carbon trichloride, carbon tetrachloride, benzene, toluene, nitrobenzene ether, ligroin and carbon disulfide, but soluble in pyridine and glacial acetic acid. It dissolves in water and dissociates completely in dilute solutions. It oxidizes a range of organic compounds and reacts instantly (in some cases with fire) with common solvents such as tetrahydrofuran, ethanol, methanol, t-butanol, acetone and acetic acid.

== Applications ==
Magnesium permanganate is used in various branches of industry and technology, such as:

- a wood impregnation agent.
- an additive in tobacco filters.
- as a catalyst in the air oxidation of toluene to benzoic acid and in proteome research.
