= Manganese heptoxide =

Chemical compound

Manganese(VII) oxide
- Manganese(VII) oxide

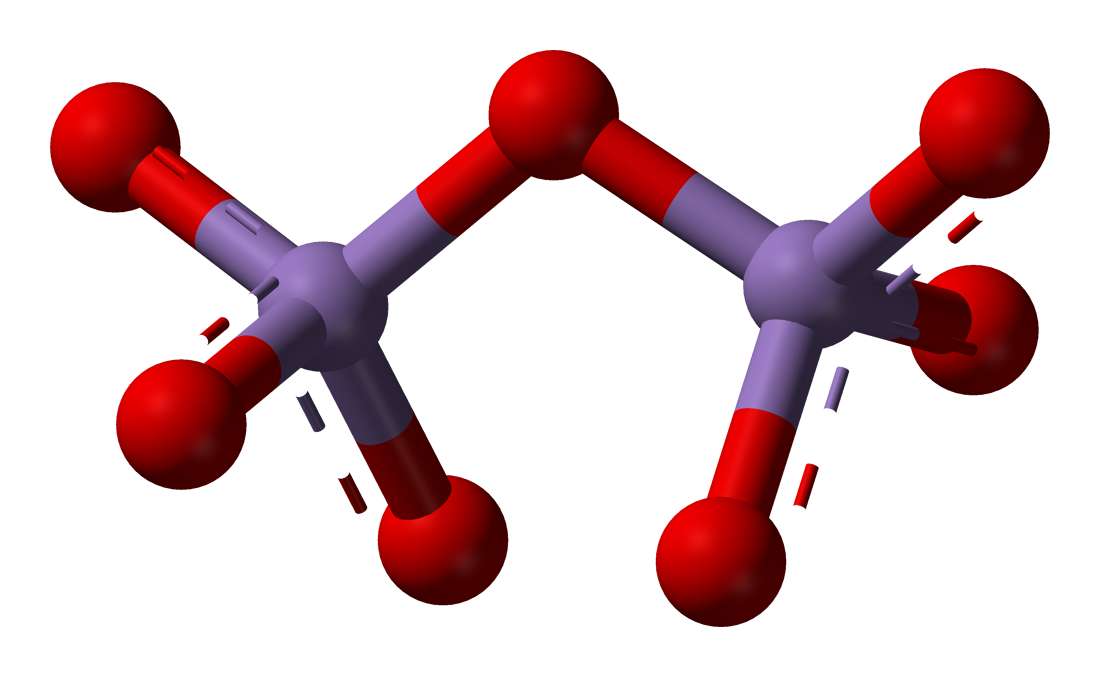
- Ball-and-stick model of manganese heptoxide

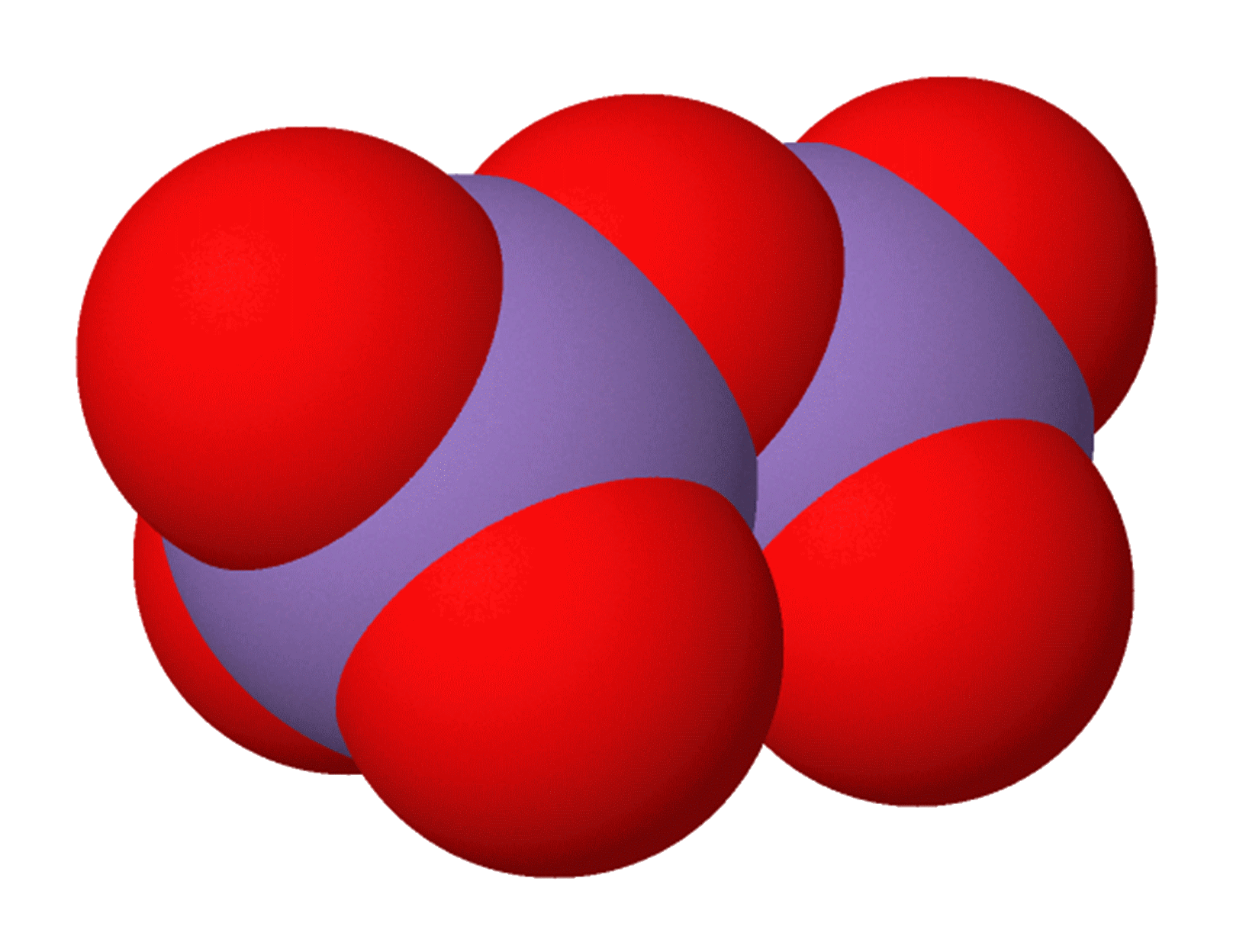
- Manganese(VII) oxide

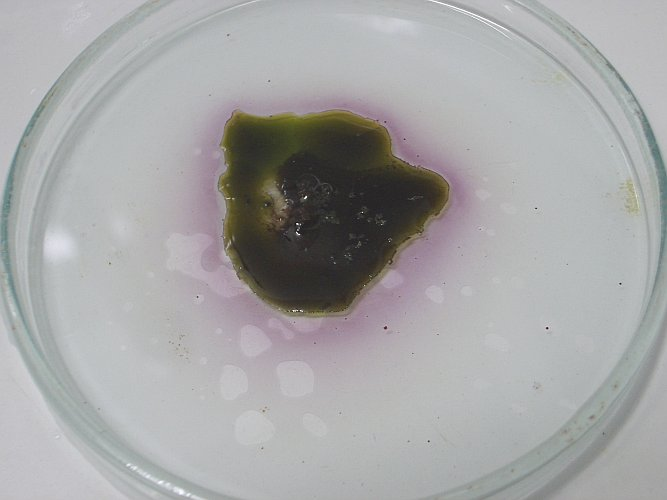

Names
- IUPAC name Manganese(VII) oxide
- Other names: Manganic oxide; Dimanganese Heptoxide; Permanganic anhydride; Permanganic oxide

Identifiers
CAS Number	12057-92-0
3D model (JSmol)	Interactive image
ChemSpider	9944714
ECHA InfoCard	100.031.829
EC Number	235-025-8
PubChem CID	13879826
CompTox Dashboard (EPA)	DTXSID10894891
- InChI: InChI=1S/2Mn.7O/q;;7*-2 Key: ZEFXULJEOUCCOQ-UHFFFAOYSA-N
- SMILES: O=[Mn](=O)(=O)O[Mn](=O)(=O)=O

Properties
Chemical formula	Mn_{2}O_{7}
Molar mass	221.869 g·mol^{−1}
Appearance	dark red oil (room temp.), green if in contact with sulfuric acid
Density	2.79 g/cm^{3}
Melting point	5.9 °C (42.6 °F; 279.0 K)
Boiling point	explodes on heating
Solubility in water	decomposes to permanganic acid, HMnO_{4}

Structure
Crystal structure	monoclinic
Coordination geometry	bitetrahedral

Hazards
- Occupational safety and health (OHS/OSH)
Main hazards	explosive, strong oxidizer, very corrosive

Related compounds
Related compounds	Rhenium(VII) oxide; Potassium permanganate; Technetium(VII) oxide; Dichlorine heptoxide
- Except where otherwise noted, data are given for materials in their standard state (at 25 °C [77 °F], 100 kPa). verify (what is ?) Infobox references

Manganese(VII) oxide (manganese heptoxide) is an inorganic compound with the formula Mn_{2}O_{7}. Manganese heptoxide is a volatile liquid with an oily consistency. It is a highly reactive and powerful oxidizer that reacts explosively with nearly any organic compound. It was first described in 1860. It is the acid anhydride of permanganic acid.

== Properties ==
The crystalline form of this chemical compound is dark green. The liquid is green by reflected light and red by transmitted light.

== Structure ==
Its solubility properties indicate a nonpolar molecular species, which is confirmed by its structure. The molecules consist of a pair of tetrahedra that share a common vertex. The vertices are occupied by oxygen atoms and at the centers of the tetrahedra are the Mn(VII) centers. The connectivity is indicated by the formula O_{3}−Mn−O−MnO_{3}. The terminal Mn−O distances are 1.585 Å and the bridging oxygen is 1.77 Å distant from the two Mn atoms. The Mn−O−Mn angle is 120.7°.

Pyrosulfate, pyrophosphate, and dichromate adopt structures similar to that of Mn_{2}O_{7}. Probably the most similar main group species is Cl_{2}O_{7}. Focusing on comparisons within the transition metal series, Tc_{2}O_{7} and Mn_{2}O_{7} are structurally similar but the Tc−O−Tc angle is 180°. Solid Re_{2}O_{7} is not molecular but consists of crosslinked Re centers with both tetrahedral and octahedral sites; in the vapour phase it is molecular with a similar structure to Tc_{2}O_{7}.

== Synthesis and reactions ==
Manganese heptoxide (Mn_{2}O_{7}) arises as a dark green oil by the addition of cold concentrated sulfuric acid (H_{2}SO_{4}) to solid potassium permanganate (KMnO_{4}). The reaction initially produces permanganic acid, HMnO_{4} (structurally, HOMnO_{3}), which is dehydrated by cold sulfuric acid to form its anhydride, Mn_{2}O_{7}:

2 KMnO_{4} + 2 H_{2}SO_{4} → Mn_{2}O_{7} + H_{2}O + 2 KHSO_{4}

Manganese heptoxide can react further with sulfuric acid to give the manganyl(VII) cation MnO^{+}_{3}, which is isoelectronic with CrO_{3}:

Mn_{2}O_{7} + 2 H_{2}SO_{4} → 2 [MnO_{3}]^{+}[HSO_{4}]^{−} + H_{2}O

Manganese heptoxide decomposes near room temperature, explosively so above 55 °C (131 °F). The explosion can be initiated by striking the sample or by its exposure to oxidizable organic compounds. The products are manganese dioxide (MnO_{2}) and oxygen (O_{2}). Ozone (O_{3}) is also produced, giving a strong smell to the substance. The ozone can spontaneously ignite a piece of paper impregnated with an alcohol solution.

Manganese heptoxide reacts with hydrogen peroxide (H_{2}O_{2}) in presence of sulfuric acid, liberating oxygen and ozone and forming manganese(II) sulfate (MnSO_{4}):

2 Mn_{2}O_{7} + 2 H_{2}O_{2} + 4 H_{2}SO_{4} → 4 MnSO_{4} + 6 H_{2}O + 2 O_{3} + 3 O_{2}
