= Tautomycin =

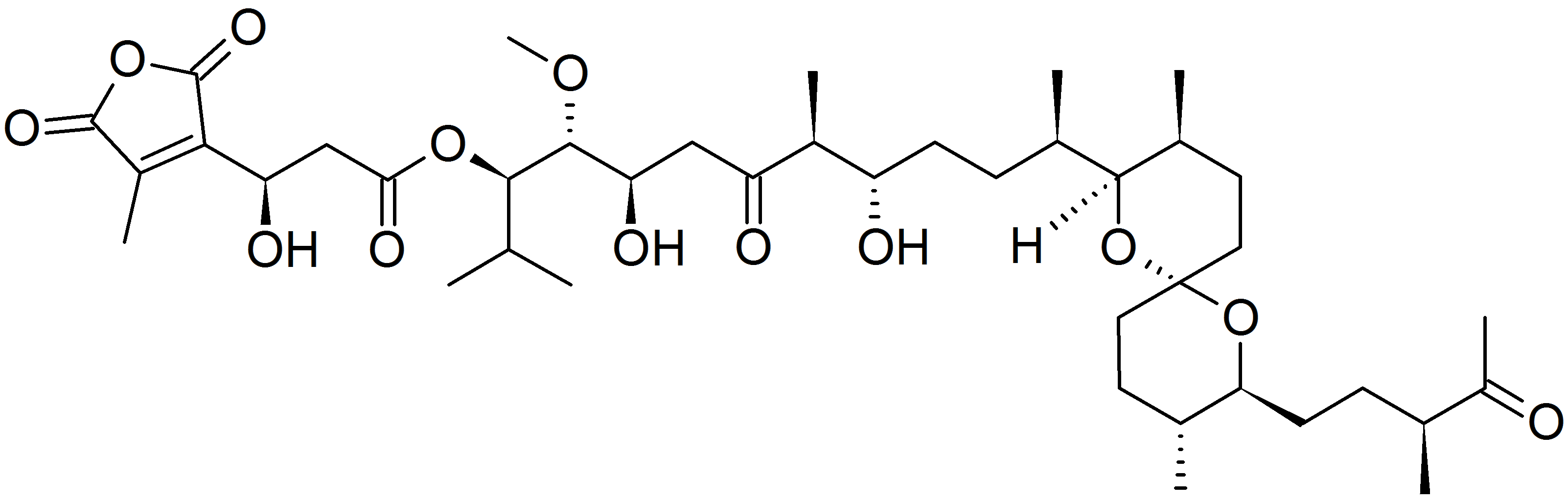

Names
- Preferred IUPAC name (3R,4R,5R,8S,9S,12R)-12-{(2S,3S,6R,8S,9R)-3,9-Dimethyl-8-[(3S)-3-methyl-4-oxopentyl]-1,7-dioxaspiro[5.5]undecan-2-yl}-5,9-dihydroxy-4-methoxy-2,8-dimethyl-7-oxotridecan-3-yl (3R)-3-hydroxy-3-(4-methyl-2,5-dioxo-2,5-dihydrofuran-3-yl)propanoate

Identifiers
CAS Number	109946-35-2
3D model (JSmol)	Interactive image
ChEBI	CHEBI:9414
ChEMBL	ChEMBL505512
ChemSpider	389529
ECHA InfoCard	100.149.857
EC Number	620-961-5
KEGG	C05372
PubChem CID	440646
CompTox Dashboard (EPA)	DTXSID10894179
- InChI: InChI=1S/C41H66O13/c1-21(2)36(51-34(47)20-31(45)35-27(8)39(48)52-40(35)49)38(50-10)32(46)19-30(44)26(7)29(43)13-11-24(5)37-25(6)16-18-41(54-37)17-15-23(4)33(53-41)14-12-22(3)28(9)42/h21-26,29,31-33,36-38,43,45-46H,11-20H2,1-10H3/t22-,23+,24+,25-,26-,29-,31+,32+,33-,36+,37-,38+,41+/m0/s1 Key: RFCWHQNNCOJYTR-IRCAEPKSSA-N; InChI=1S/C41H66O13/c1-21(2)36(51-34(47)20-31(45)35-27(8)39(48)52-40(35)49)38(50-10)32(46)19-30(44)26(7)29(43)13-11-24(5)37-25(6)16-18-41(54-37)17-15-23(4)33(53-41)14-12-22(3)28(9)42/h21-26,29,31-33,36-38,43,45-46H,11-20H2,1-10H3/t22-,23+,24+,25-,26-,29-,31+,32+,33-,36+,37-,38+,41+/m0/s1; InChI=1S/C41H66O13/c1-21(2)36(51-34(47)20-31(45)35-27(8)39(48)52-40(35)49)38(50-10)32(46)19-30(44)26(7)29(43)13-11-24(5)37-25(6)16-18-41(54-37)17-15-23(4)33(53-41)14-12-22(3)28(9)42/h21-26,29,31-33,36-38,43,45-46H,11-20H2,1-10H3/t22-,23+,24+,25-,26-,29-,31+,32+,33-,36+,37-,38+,41+/m0/s1 Key: RFCWHQNNCOJYTR-IRCAEPKSSA-N
- SMILES: O=C\1OC(=O)/C(=C/1C)[C@H](O)CC(=O)O[C@H](C(C)C)[C@H](OC)[C@H](O)CC(=O)[C@@H](C)[C@@H](O)CC[C@H]([C@@H]3O[C@@]2(O[C@H]([C@H](C)CC2)CC[C@@H](C(=O)C)C)CC[C@@H]3C)C

Properties
Chemical formula	C_{41}H_{66}O_{13}
Molar mass	766.966 g·mol^{−1}
- Except where otherwise noted, data are given for materials in their standard state (at 25 °C [77 °F], 100 kPa). verify (what is ?) Infobox references

Tautomycin is a chemical that occurs naturally in shellfish and is produced by the bacterium Streptomyces spiroverticillatus. It is a polyketide-based structure characterized by a three hydroxyl groups, two ketones, a dialkylmaleic anhydride, an ester linkage (connecting anhydride unit to polyketide chain), a spiroketal and one methyl ether among others.

== Pharmacology ==
It is a very potent inhibitor of the protein phosphatases PP1 and PP2A. Tautomycin demonstrates a slight preference for PP1 inhibition relative to PP2A inhibition. Tautomycin is closely related to another anhydride containing polyketide PP inhibitor called tautomycetin which, in addition to being useful as a lead for cancer drug discovery, also is a very potent immunosuppressor. The mechanism of immunosuppression by Tautomycetin differs from that of more classical immunosuppressors such as rapamycin and tacrolimus.
