= Base anhydride =

Oxide of a chemical element from alkali- or alkaline earth metals

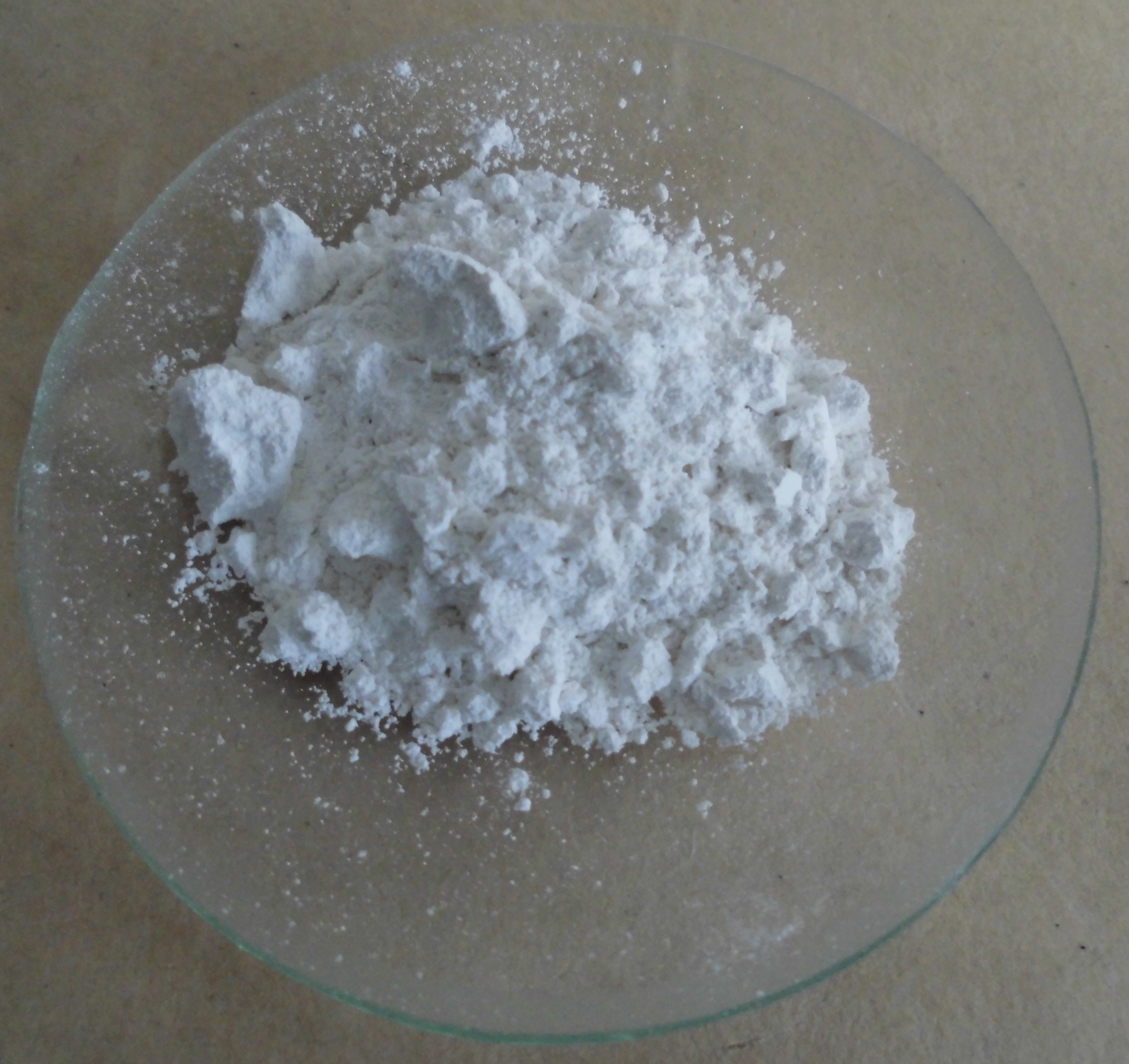
Calcium oxide powder, the base anhydride corresponding to calcium hydroxide.

A base anhydride is an oxide of a chemical element from group 1 or 2 (the alkali metals and alkaline earth metals, respectively). They are obtained by removing water from the corresponding hydroxide base. If water is added to a base anhydride, a corresponding hydroxide salt can be [re]-formed.

Base anhydrides are Brønsted–Lowry bases because they are proton acceptors. In addition, they are Lewis bases, because they will share an electron pair with some Lewis acids, most notably acidic oxides. They are potent alkalis and will produce alkali burns on skin, because their affinity for water (that is, their affinity for being slaked) makes them react with body water.

== Examples ==
- Quicklime (calcium oxide) is a base anhydride. It reacts with water to become hydrated lime (calcium hydroxide), which is a strong base, chemically akin to lye. This reaction is exothermic.

CaO + H_{2}O → Ca(OH)_{2} (ΔH_{r} = −63.7 kJ/mol of CaO)

- Sodium oxide is a very strong base that reacts readily and irreversibly with water to give sodium hydroxide:

Na_{2}O + H_{2}O → 2 NaOH

== See also ==
- Acid anhydride
- Acidic oxide
