= Acid anhydride =

Chemical compound derived by removing water from an acid

Structural formula of a general carboxylic anhydride group ((RCO)2O).

An acid anhydride is a type of chemical compound composed of two acyl groups bonded to a common oxygen atom. They are commonly formed by the removal of water molecules from a pair of acids.

In organic chemistry, organic acid anhydrides contain the functional group −C(=O)−O−C(=O)−. Organic acid anhydrides often form when one equivalent of water is removed from two equivalents of an organic acid in a dehydration reaction.

In inorganic chemistry, an acid anhydride can refer to an acidic oxide, i.e., an oxide that reacts with water to form an oxyacid (an inorganic acid that contains oxygen or carbonic acid), or with a base to form a salt. For example, dinitrogen trioxide is the anhydride of nitrous acid. Similarly, dinitrogen pentoxide is the anhydride of nitric acid:

N_{2}O_{5} + H_{2}O → 2 HNO_{3}

== See also ==
- Base anhydride, an oxide that reacts with water to form a hydroxide salt
