= Postmasburg Manganese Field =

Mine in South Africa

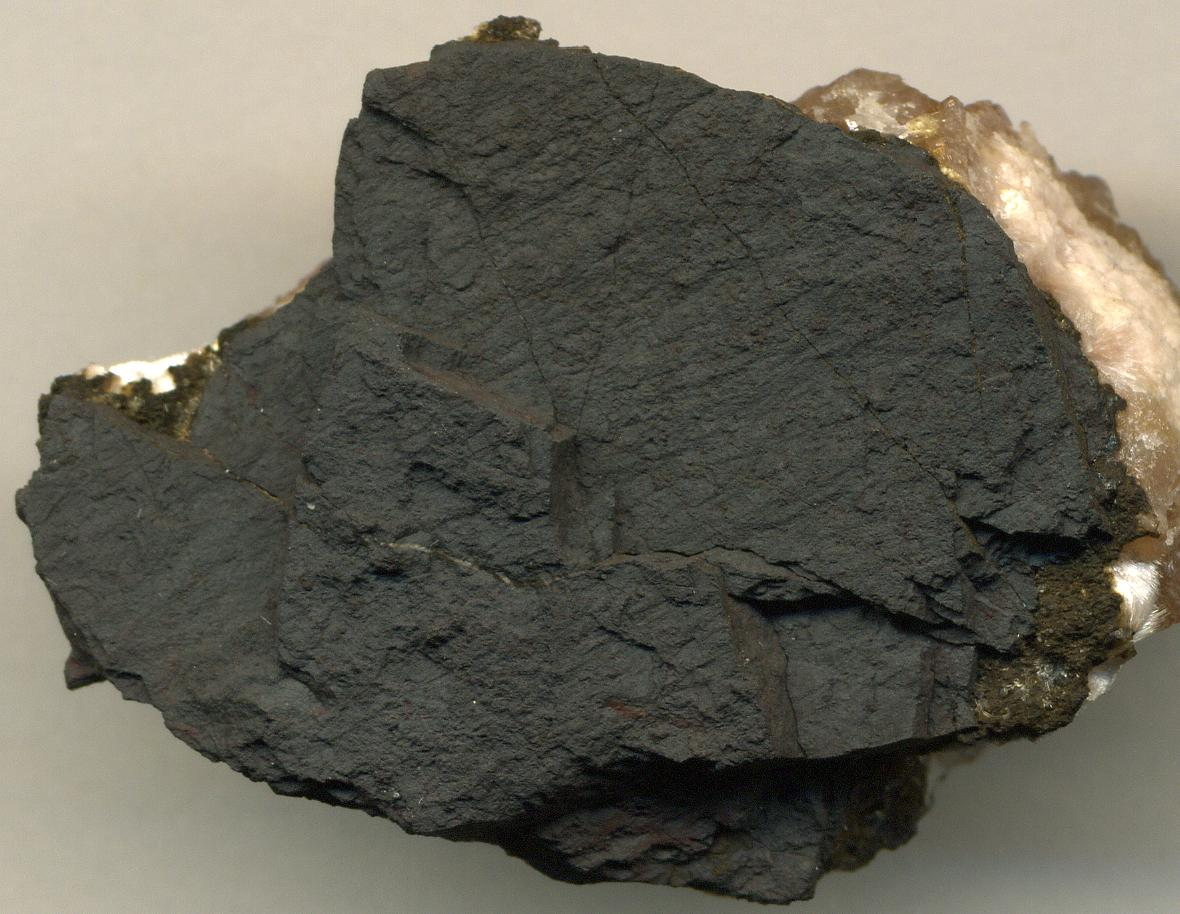
- Manganese ore (3.5 cm across) from the Hotazel Formation (uppermost Transvaal Group, middle Paleoproterozoic, ≈ 2.05 Ga) at the N’Chwaning II Mine in the Kalahari Manganese Field, Northern Cape Province, South Africa.

- Location of Postmasburg Manganese Field
- Location: Postmasburg, Northern Cape, South Africa; 28.040083°S 23.043222°E
- Products: Manganese
- Production: 3-4 million tons annually
- Opened: 1957 (Gloria Mine)
- Company: Assmang (African Rainbow Minerals and Anglo American)
- Acquired: 1957 (Gloria Mine)

The Postmasburg Manganese Field (PMF) is a manganese deposit located in the Northern Cape Province, South Africa.

== History ==
The Postmasburg Manganese Field's (PMF) history began with early geological mapping in 1930 and local prospecting in 1940s. Systematic exploration in the 1950s led to discoveries at Gloria mine (1953), Nchwaning mine (1955), Mamatwan mine (1957), and Wessels mine (1958). Mining commenced with Gloria Mine in 1957, followed by Nchwaning in 1972.

== Local Geology ==
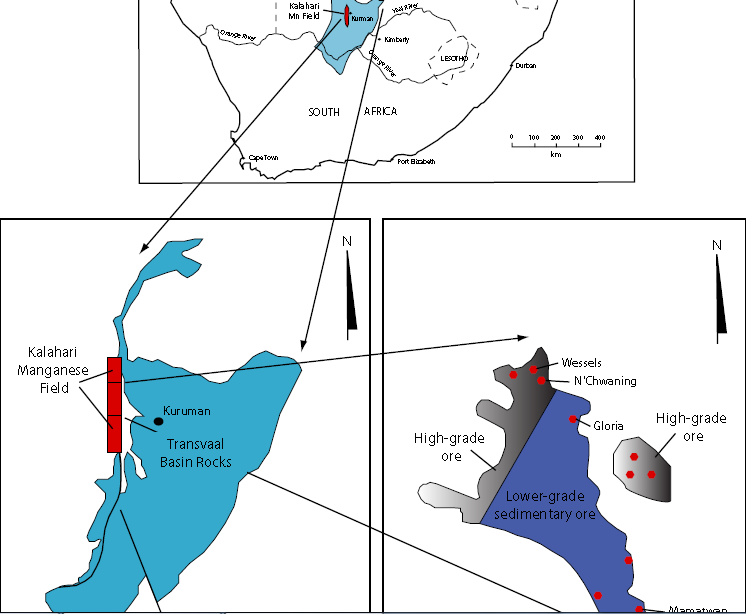
Kalahari and Postmansburg Manganese Fields

The PMF is situated within the Kalahari Manganese Field, a 2.5 Ga old Paleoproterozoic sedimentary basin in South Africa's Northern Cape Province. The PMF's stratigraphy comprises the Mamatwan, Gloria, Nchwaning, and Wessels formations, featuring manganese-bearing sedimentary rocks, iron-rich rocks, siliceous rocks, dolostone, and limestone. Tight folding, faulting, and jointing characterize the structural geology and ore genesis of these manganese ore deposits.

The manganese deposits formed in shallow marine and tidal flat environments through syngenetic and epigenetic mineralization. Key geological features include the Kalahari Fault and Thabazimbi-Middelburg Lineament.

== Deposit Characteristics ==
The PMF is characterized by sedimentary, tabular, and stratiform manganese deposits with Mn grades from 40 to 50%. Primarily, the manganese ore is composed of the minerals braunite, bixbyite, and hausmannite, with subordinate iron and silica. Typically, the manganese ore bodies are 5–20 m thick, with strike lengths of up to 10 km. Depth extension reaches up to 400 m, with reserve estimates exceeding 100 Mt, with a life-of-mine of approximately 20–30 years. Mineralization is both syngenetic and epigenetic, with fine-grained, laminated, and brecciated ore textures. A special feature of the PMF is that it contains more than 135 species of minerals, some of which are very rare.

== Production ==
The PMF is a substantial global manganese producer, with annual production of approximately 3–4 Mt of manganese ore. The mining method employed is underground room and pillar and open pit mining, followed by crushing, screening, and beneficiation processing. The PMF's processing plants are located at Nchwaning and Gloria, with a combined capacity to produce high grade manganese ore. The ore is then transported via a 130 km railway to the Sishen-Saldanha export line, and ultimately exported through the Saldanha Bay and Durban ports.

== Infrastructure ==
The PMF's infrastructure supports manganese ore extraction, processing, and transportation. The operation consists of four mines: Gloria, Nchwaning, Mamatwan, and Wessels, with access to national highways (N14 and N18) facilitating road transport. Water supply is secured through a scheme from the Vaal River and local boreholes, and electricity is provided by Eskom and on-site generation. Nearby towns, Postmasburg, Kathu, and Olivienhoutbosch, offer amenities, and air travel is through the local airfield and Kimberley International Airport.

== Environmental Challenges ==
The PMF's environmental challenges include water pollution, which is a major concern, as mining activities contaminate ground- and surface water sources. Air pollution is another issue, with dust emissions from mining and processing operations affecting local communities. Soil degradation and loss of biodiversity are also pressing concerns, resulting from habitat destruction and fragmentation.

== See also ==
- Nchwaning mine
- Wessels mine
- Gloria mine
- Mamatwan mine
