= Postmasburg =

- Location within Northern Cape Location within South Africa
- Coordinates: 28.3279°S 23.0706°E
- Country: South Africa
- Province: Northern Cape
- District: ZF Mgcawu
- Municipality: Tsantsabane

Area
  - Total: 158.41 km^{2} (61.16 sq mi)

Population (2011)
  - Total: 30,089
  - Density: 189.94/km^{2} (491.95/sq mi)

Racial makeup (2011)
  - Black African: 54.6%
  - Coloured: 36.8%
  - Indian/Asian: 0.5%
  - White: 7.4%
  - Other: 0.7%

First languages (2011)
  - Afrikaans: 53.9%
  - Tswana: 33.6%
  - Xhosa: 2.7%
  - Sotho: 2.6%
  - Other: 7.2%
- Time zone: UTC+2 (SAST)
- Postal code (street): 8420
- PO box: 8420
- Area code: 053

Postmasburg is a town in the Northern Cape province of South Africa.

== Location ==
The Town is located approximately 214 km east of Upington and 197 km west of Kimberley. It is 67 km (42 mi) north of Griquatown and 58 km (36 mi) west-south-west of Daniëlskuil.

== History ==
Originally a station of the London Missionary Society called Sibiling, it became a Griqua village with the name Blinkklip. It was proclaimed a town on 6 June 1892 and named after the Reverend Dirk Postma (1818–1890), founder of the Reformed Churches in South Africa.

The town achieved municipal status in 1936.

== Army ==
The South African Army's Combat Training Centre is located nearby, at Lohatla.

== Arts and Entertainment ==
Postmasburg has developed an arts and entertainment culture that reflects the Tsantsabane municipality. The town has produced notable talent across multiple genres, demonstrating both artistic depth and commercial potential.

Singer Thato Makape rose to national prominence as a finalist in the 2018 season of Idols South Africa, placing Postmasburg on the mainstream entertainment map. The local gospel scene has been shaped by artists such as Mannie White, Vusi Mkhandi, Wentzel de Bruin, Tempest, Dennis Orr, and Moholo Bucks, whose music continues to influence faith-based audiences regionally.

The contemporary music landscape includes hip-hop, Afro-pop and kwaito performers such as Krazy Phillips, Black Diamond, Sesa and Joy Oleseng, reflecting the diversity of sound emerging from the town. This cross-genre presence signals the foundation of a growing creative economy rather than isolated artistic activity.

Community-driven events including PMG Homecoming, Jay’s All Black, Die Blom, Umswenko and the PMG Fashion Show form part of the town’s entertainment calendar. These events are supported by hospitality venues such as Costa’s Lounge, Shabba’s Carwash and Die Ou Stoel, which serve as informal performance and networking spaces for local creatives.

In 2025, the Tsantsabane Black Business Chamber (TBBC) announced initiatives aimed at supporting creative practitioners and formalising the entertainment sector within the municipality. This recognition signals a shift toward structured development of the creative industries as a viable economic contributor to Tsantsabane’s future.

== Economy ==
Postmasburg is home to Kolomela Mine which is owned by Anglo American. The Iron Ore mine officially opened in June 2012 provides job opportunities for the local communities.

Postmasburg is also home to the Nchwaning, Wessels, Gloria and Mamatwan mines within the Postmasburg Manganese Field.

== See also ==
- Redstone Solar Thermal Power
- Jasper Solar Energy Project
- Lesedi Solar Park
