= Manganese oxide =

Manganese oxide is any of a variety of manganese oxides and hydroxides. These include

- Manganese(II) oxide, MnO
- Manganese(II,III) oxide, Mn_{3}O_{4}
- Manganese(III) oxide, Mn_{2}O_{3}
- Manganese dioxide, MnO_{2}
- Manganese(VI) oxide, MnO_{3}
- Manganese(VII) oxide, Mn_{2}O_{7}

Other manganese oxides include Mn_{5}O_{8}, Mn_{7}O_{12} and Mn_{7}O_{13}.

== Minerals ==
It may refer more specifically to the following manganese minerals:

- Birnessite, (Na,Ca)_{0.5}(Mn^{IV},Mn^{III})_{2}O_{4} · 1.5 H_{2}O
- Buserite, MnO_{2}·nH_{2}O
- Hausmannite, Mn^{II}Mn^{III}_{2}O_{4}
- Manganite, Mn^{III}O(OH)
- Manganosite, Mn^{II}O
- Psilomelane, Ba(Mn^{II})(Mn^{IV})_{8}O_{16}(OH)_{4}, or (Ba,H_{2}O)_{2}Mn_{5}O_{10}
- Pyrolusite, Mn^{IV}O_{2}

Manganese may also form mixed oxides with other metals:

- Bixbyite, (Fe^{III},Mn^{III})_{2}O_{3}, a manganese(III) iron(III) oxide mineral
- Jacobsite, Mn^{II}Fe^{III}_{2}O_{4}, a manganese(II) iron(III) oxide mineral
- Columbite, (Fe^{II},Mn^{II})Nb_{2}O_{6}, a niobate of iron(II) and manganese(II)
- Tantalite, (Fe^{II},Mn^{II})Ta_{2}O_{6}, a tantalum(V) mineral group close to that of columbite
- Coltan, a mixture of columbite and tantalite series
- Galaxite, Mn^{II}Al_{2}O_{4}, a spinel mineral
- Todorokite, (Na,Ca,K,Ba,Sr)_{1-x}(Mn,Mg,Al)_{6}O_{12}·3-4H_{2}O, a rare complex hydrous manganese oxide mineral
