= Nchwaning mine =

Manganese mine in Northern Cape, South Africa

Coordinates: 27.1292°S 22.8380°E

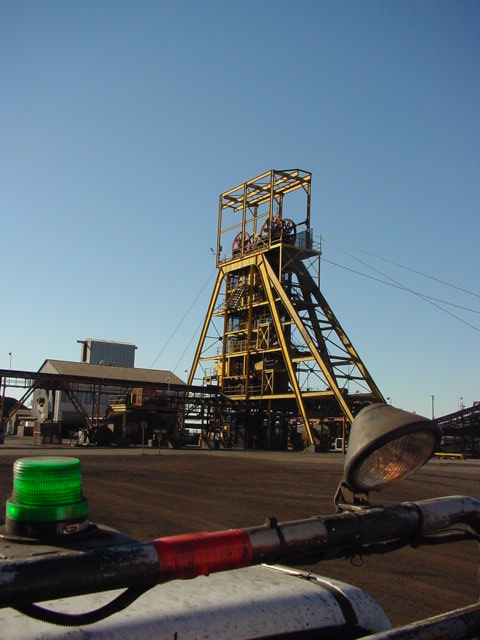
- The N'Chwaning II headgear
- Interactive map of Nchwaning mine
- Location: Northern Cape, South Africa
- Products: Manganese
- Company: Assmang

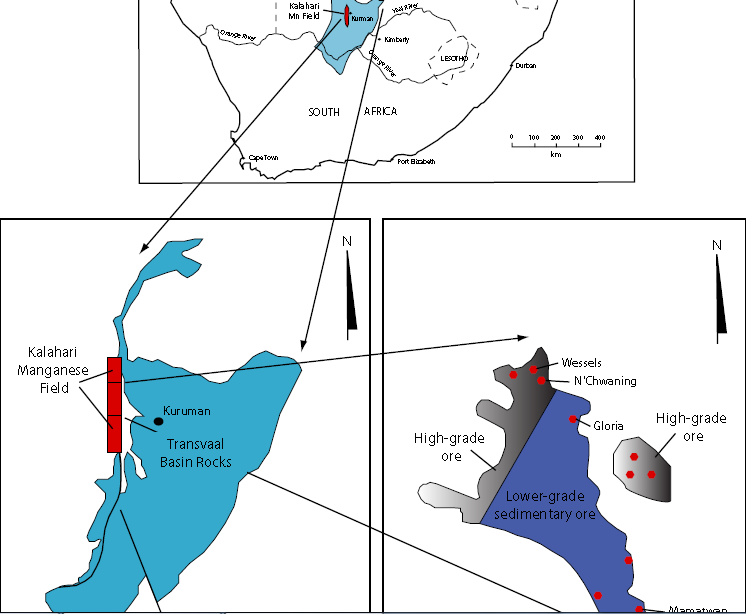
Kalahari Manganese Field geological map

The N'chwaning mine (or N'Chwaning mines) are located in the Northern Cape Province of South Africa. N'chwaning has one of the largest manganese reserves in South Africa having estimated reserves of 323.2 million tonnes of manganese ore grading 42.5% manganese. There are three shafts, designated as N'Chwaning, N'Chwaning II and N'Chwaning III. The majority of the major mineral finds documented originate from the N'Chwaning II shaft.

N'Chwaning is considered a single vertical hoist shaft. N'Chwaning II is a vertical skip shaft, currently still in production with an underground crushing facility. N'Chwaning III has two main shafts – a vertical personnel shaft and a decline shaft. N'Chwaning III additionally has seven underground silos for storing different grades of ore.

N'Chwaning is known to produce high-quality mineral specimens of rhodochrosite, manganite, ettringite, inesite, jouravskite and other minerals.

The N'Chwaning mine is located on the farm N'Chwaning 267, from which the name is derived. The license area also includes what was formerly known as the Black Rock mine area, and is situated in the manganese ores of the Kalahari Manganese Fields.

== History ==
The ore body was discovered in 1940 by Assmang, and led to the acquisition of a manganese outcrop. The properties on which the ore is situated were subsequently acquired by Assmang, and led to the 1975 commissioning of the Gloria mine (medium grade carbonated ore) as well as the later commissioning in 1972, 1981 and 2004 respectively of the N'Chwaning I, I and III shafts.

== Geology ==
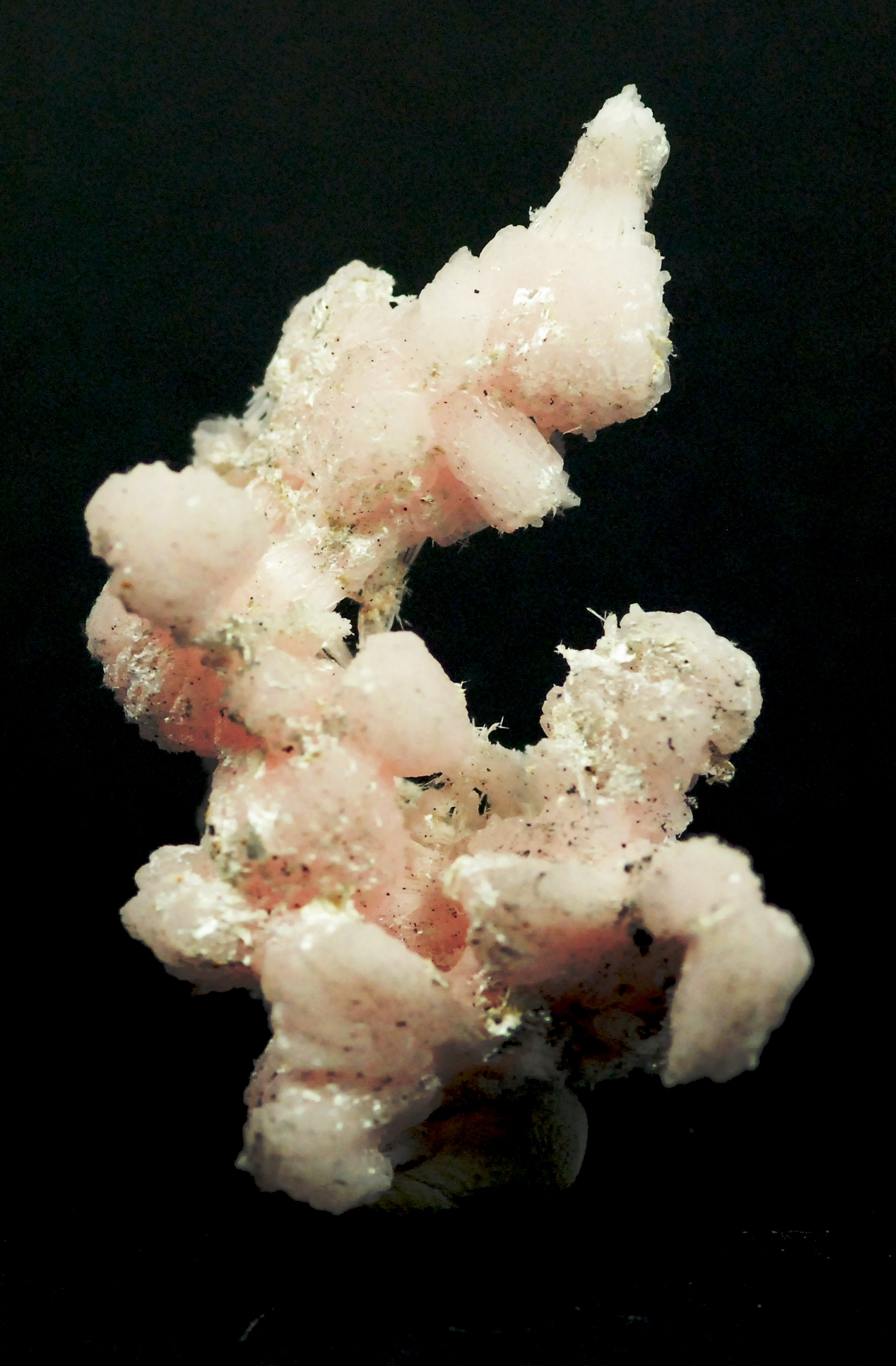
Manganocalcite with kutnohorite from the N'Chwaning II mine

The N'Chwaning mines are situated in the Kalahari Manganese Fields, with the primary ore hosted in the Hotazel Formation of the Griqualand West Sequence, forming part of the Proterozoic Transvaal Supergroup.

The ore body shows extreme faulting and hydrothermal upgrading, responsible for the formation of a large majority of the mineral species described from the Kalahari Manganese Fields. Zoning exists within the ore body both in the vertical and horizontal sense, where horizontal zoning is fault related and shows high grade hausmannite ore, intermediate areas show a very complex mineral assemblage (including braunite and jacobsite), while distal areas have a lower grade ore consisting predominantly of braunite and kutnohorite.

Vertical zoning in the orebody is shown by high iron and low manganese concentrations at the contacts, with an increase in manganese grade towards the centre of the body. Two seams are mined – the No.1 seam is on average 6 metres thick, with a depth of 400 metres at the N'Chwaning mine and a depth of 200 metres at the Gloria mine. The No.2 seam is stratigraphically placed above the No.1 seam, with ongoing mining using the N'Chwaning II infrastructure.

== See also ==
- Wessels mine
- Gloria mine
- Mamatwan mine
