= Inesite =

Hydrous calcium manganese silicate mineral

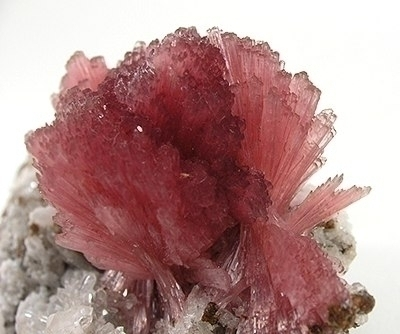
- Inesite Crystals from Fengjishan Mine (Daye Copper Mine), Edong Mining District, Daye County, Huangshi Prefecture, Hubei Province, China.

General
- Category: Inosilicates
- Formula: Ca_{2}Mn_{7}Si_{10}O_{28}(OH)_{2}•5(H_{2}O)
- IMA symbol: Ins
- Strunz classification: 09.DL.05
- Dana classification: 66.3.3.1
- Crystal system: Triclinic
- Space group: P1̅ (no.2)

Identification
- Color: Rose red, pink, orange-pink, orange-red-brown
- Crystal habit: Massive, fibrous, radial, spherical
- Cleavage: Perfect
- Fracture: Irregular/Uneven
- Tenacity: Brittle
- Mohs scale hardness: 5.5 - 6
- Luster: Vitreous, Silky
- Streak: White
- Diaphaneity: Translucent
- Specific gravity: 3.0
- Ultraviolet fluorescence: Non-fluorescent
- Common impurities: Fe, Al, Mg, K

Inesite is a hydrous calcium manganese silicate mineral. Its chemical formula is Ca_{2}Mn_{7}Si_{10}O_{28}(OH)_{2}•5(H_{2}O). Inesite is an inosilicate with a triclinic crystal system. It has a Mohs hardness of 5.5 to 6, and a specific gravity of 3.0. Its name originates from the Greek Ίνες (ines), "fibers" in allusion to its color and habit.

== Occurrence and distribution ==
Inesite occurs in hydrothermal replacement deposits of manganese-rich metamorphic rocks and serpentines. It was first described in 1887 at Hilfe Gottes Mine, Oberscheld, Dillenburg, Dillenburg District, Hesse, Germany. Outside of the type locality, there are several notable localities of inesite, such as:

- Wessels and N'Chwanning Mines, Kalahari Manganese Field, Northern Cape, South Africa where Inesite is associated with datolite, pectolite, apophyllite, ruizite, orientite and quartz.
- Broken Hill, New South Wales, Australia.
- Långban, Persberg, Värmland, Sweden.
- Kawazu Mine, Shizuoka Prefecture, Chubu Region, Honshu Island, Japan
- Hale Creek Mine, Trinity County, California, USA, where Inesite is associated with Rhodochrosite, bementite, and hausmannite.
- Fengjishan Mine (Daye Copper Mine), Edong Mining District, Daye County, Huangshi Prefecture, Hubei Province, China.
Inesite Gallery
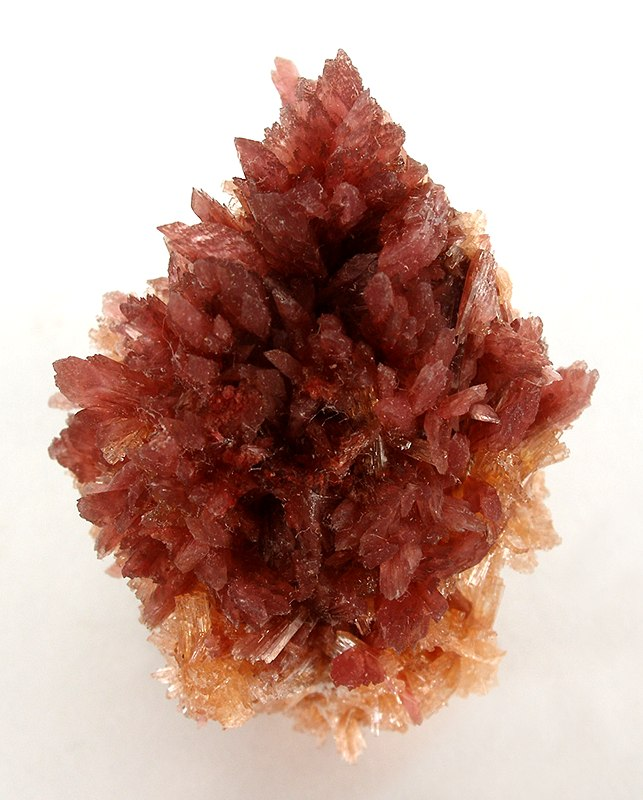
Bright red inesite with orange prehnite from N'Chwanning II Mine, Kuruman, Kalahari Manganese Field, North Cape, South Africa

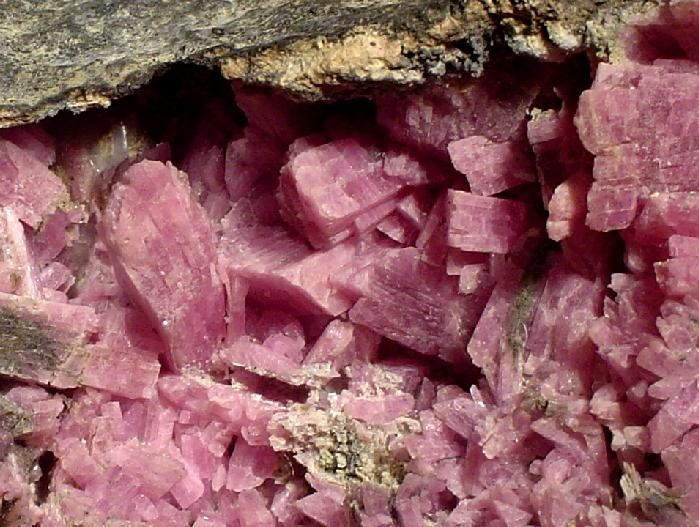
Inesite from Hale Creek Mine, Trinity County, California, USA

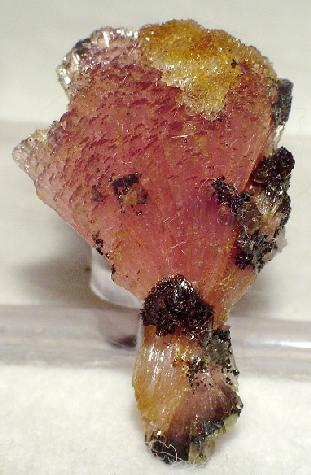
Inesite with yellow hubeite from Fengjishan Mine (Daye Copper Mine), Edong Mining District, Daye County, Huangshi Prefecture, Hubei Province, China

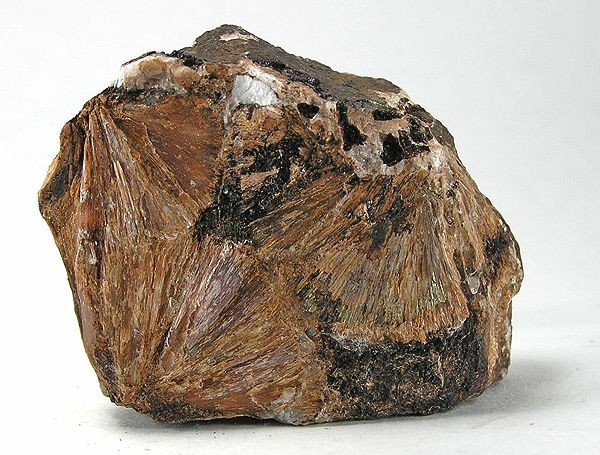
Brown Inesite from Broken Hill, New South Wales, Australia

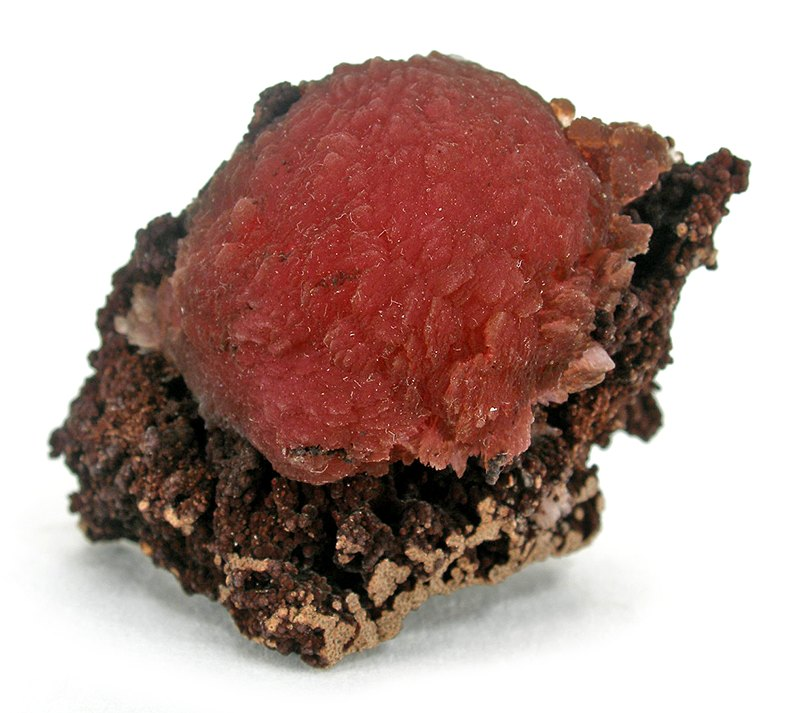
Inesite on top of orlymanite from Wessels Mine, Hotazel, Kalahari Manganese field, Northern Cape, South Africa
