= Psilomelane =

Hard black manganese oxides (romanechite, mainly)

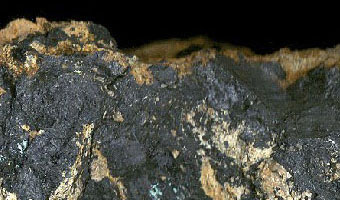

General
- Category: Oxide minerals
- Formula: General formula: Ba(Mn^{2+})(Mn^{4+})_{8}O_{16}(OH)_{4}, or as (Ba,H_{2}O)_{2}Mn_{5}O_{10} Barium manganese oxide hydroxide
- Crystal system: Monoclinic

Identification
- Formula mass: 590.03 g/mol
- Color: Black with gray pyrolusite bands
- Crystal habit: Botryoidal, mammillary, reniform
- Cleavage: None
- Fracture: Conchoidal and uneven
- Mohs scale hardness: 5.0 – 6.0
- Luster: Sub-metallic, dull
- Streak: Brownish black
- Diaphaneity: Opaque
- Specific gravity: 3.7 – 4.7
- Polish luster: Vitreous to subadamantine
- Solubility: in hydrochloric acid
- Other characteristics: Hard black manganese oxides such as hollandite and romanechite

Psilomelane is a group name for hard black manganese oxides including hollandite and romanechite. Psilomelane consists of hydrous manganese oxide with variable amounts of barium and potassium. Psilomelane is erroneously, and uncommonly, known as black hematite, despite not being related to true hematite, which is an iron oxide.

== Formula ==
Generalized formula may be represented as Ba(Mn^{2+})(Mn^{4+})_{8}O_{16}(OH)_{4} or as (Ba,H_{2}O)_{2}Mn_{5}O_{10}. It is sometimes considered to be a hydrous manganese manganate, but of doubtful composition. The amount of manganese present corresponds to 70-80% of manganous oxide with 10-15% of available oxygen.

== Characteristics ==
Psilomelane has no definite chemical composition and occurs as botryoidal and stalactitic masses with a smooth shining surface and submetallic lustre. The mineral is readily distinguished from other hydrous manganese oxides (manganite and wad) by its greater hardness 5 to 6; the specific gravity varies from 3.7 to 4.7. The streak is brownish black and the fracture smooth. The mineral often contains admixed impurities, such as iron hydroxides. It is soluble in hydrochloric acid with evolution of chlorine gas.

== History and occurrence ==
The name, dating back to 1758, makes reference to its characteristic appearance, from the ancient Greek ψιλός: psilos for (naked, smooth, bald) and μέλας: melas (black); a Latinized form is calvonigrite from calvo for (bald, smooth) and negri (black).

It is a common and important ore of manganese, occurring under the same conditions and having the same commercial applications as pyrolusite. It is found at many localities; amongst those which have yielded typical botryoidal specimens may be mentioned the Restormel iron mine at Lostwithiel in Cornwall, Brendon Hills in Somerset, Hoy in Orkney, Sayn near Coblenz, Hout Bay near Cape Town, and Crimora in Augusta county, Virginia. With pyrolusite it is extensively mined in Vermont, Virginia, Arkansas, and Nova Scotia.

== Image gallery ==
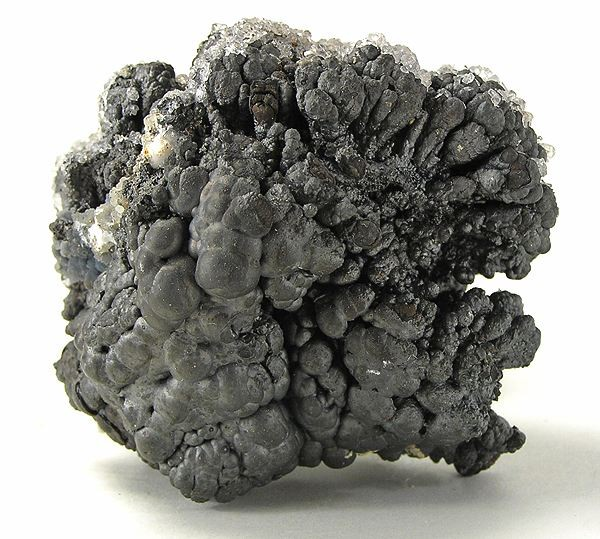
A specimen of manganese oxide

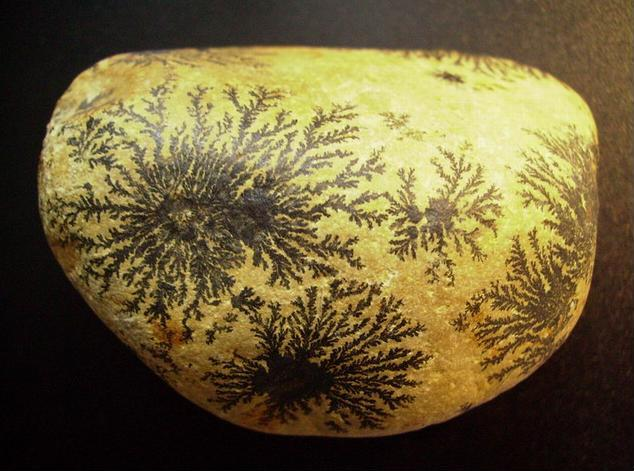
Dendritic psilomelane on a cobble

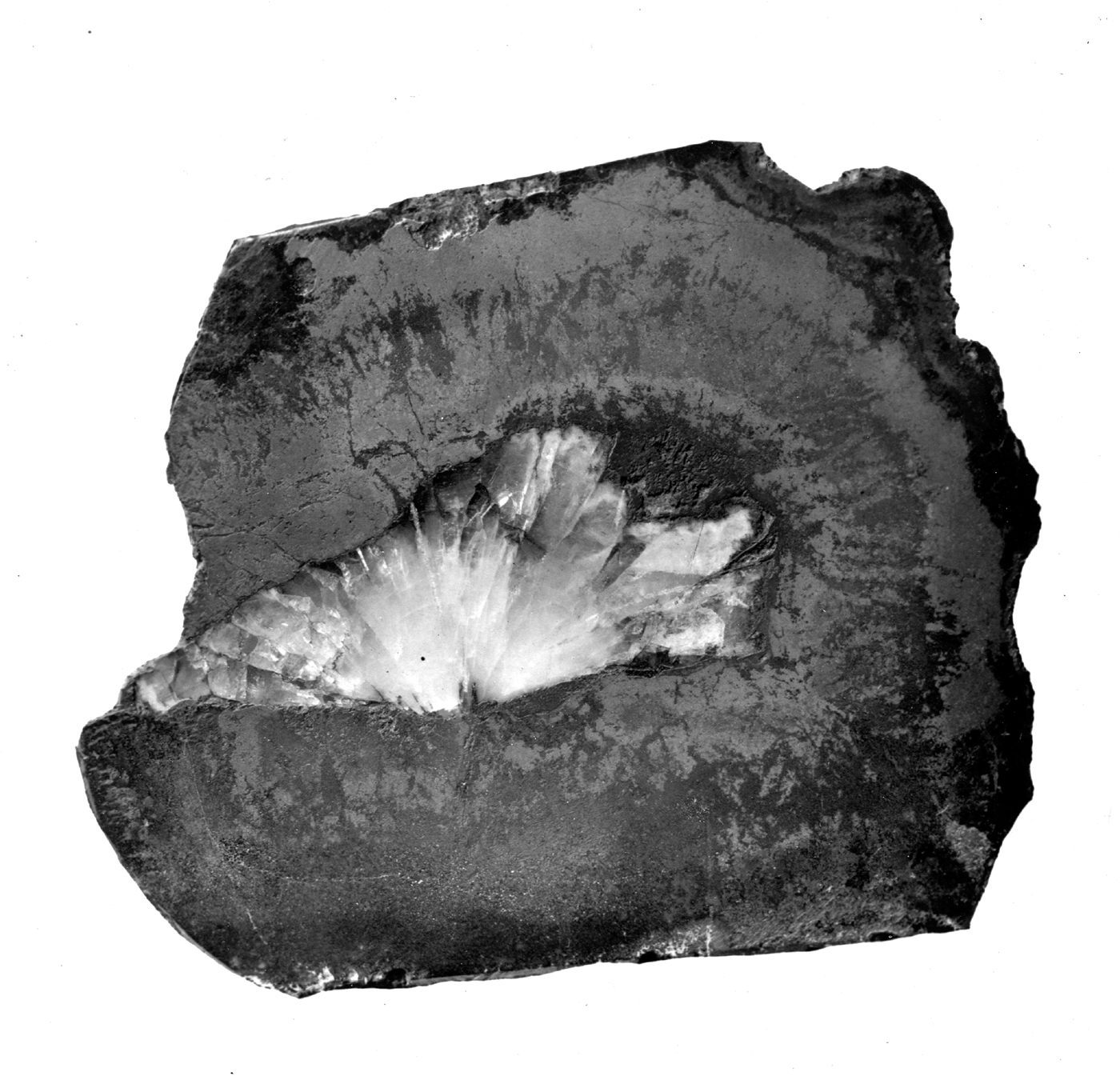
Slab of manganese ore showing a mixture of hausmannite and psilomelane in a zonal arrangement and a radiating mass of white barite at the center

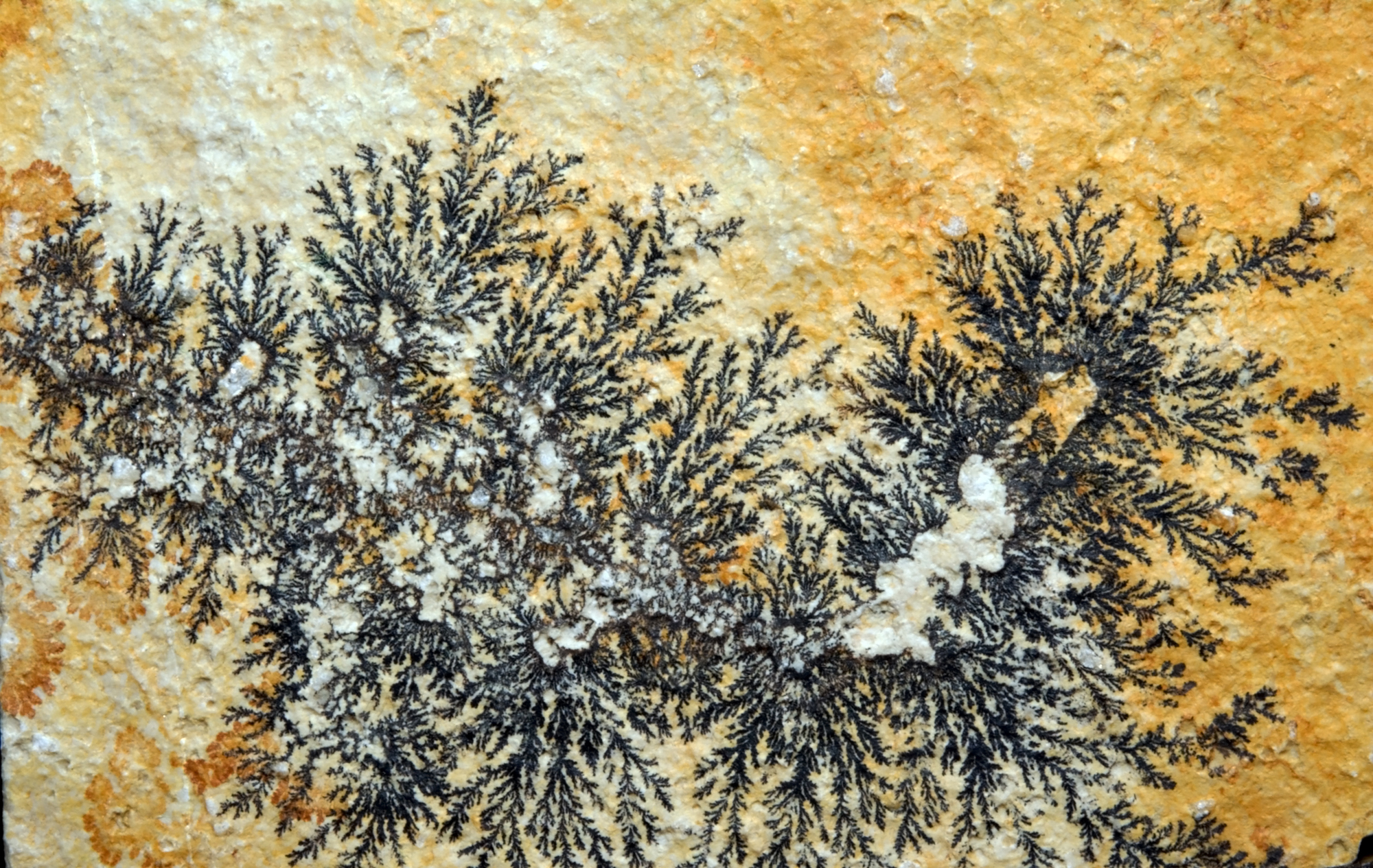
Psilomelane and pyrolusite from Solnhofen Limestone quarries, Solnhofen, Franconia, Bavaria, Germany

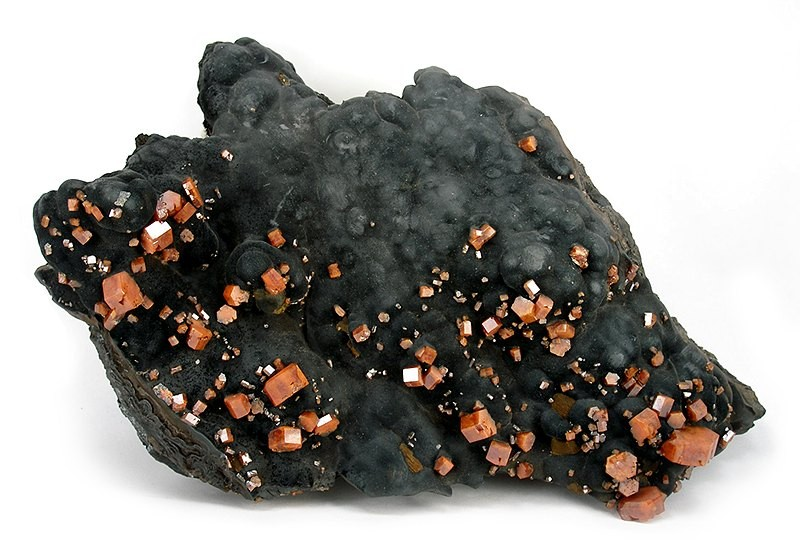
Vanadinite and psilomelane from Taouz, Er Rachidia Province, Meknès-Tafilalet Region, Morocco

== See also ==
Other manganese oxides:

- Birnessite
- Hollandite
- Pyrolusite
- Romanechite
