= Jacobsite =

Manganese iron oxide mineral

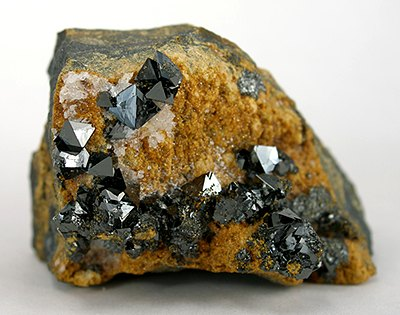

General
- Category: Oxide minerals Spinel group Spinel structural group
- Formula: iron(II,III) manganese oxide, (Mn,Mg)Fe_{2}O_{4}
- IMA symbol: Jcb
- Strunz classification: 4.BB.05
- Crystal system: Isometric
- Crystal class: Hexoctahedral (m3̅m); H-M symbol: (4/m 3̅ 2/m)
- Space group: Fd3̅m (no. 227)
- Unit cell: a = 8.457 Å; Z = 8

Identification
- Color: Black to brownish black
- Crystal habit: Disseminated to massive, rarely as octahedral crystals
- Twinning: Spinel law, flattened on {111} or lamellar
- Cleavage: {111}, probably a parting
- Fracture: Conchoidal
- Mohs scale hardness: 5.5–6.5
- Luster: Metallic
- Streak: reddish black to brown
- Diaphaneity: Opaque
- Specific gravity: 4.76
- Optical properties: Isotropic
- Refractive index: ~2.3
- Other characteristics: weakly magnetic

Jacobsite is a manganese iron oxide mineral. It is in the spinel group and forms a solid solution series with magnetite. The chemical formula is (Mn,Mg)Fe_{2}O_{4} or with oxidation states and substitutions: (Mn^{2+},Fe^{2+},Mg)(Fe^{3+},Mn^{3+})_{2}O_{4}.

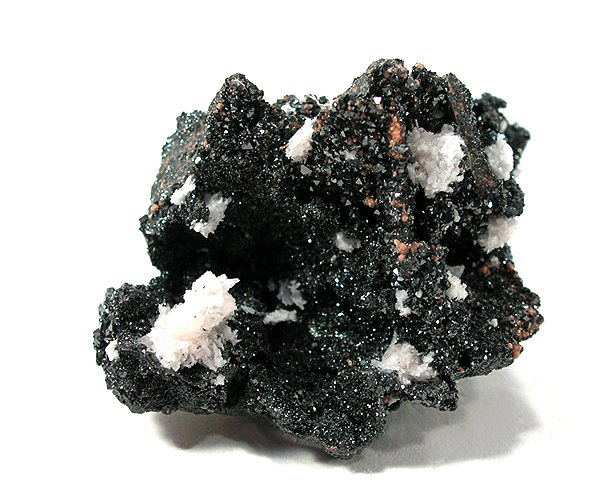
Jacobsite, N'Chwaning Mines, Kuruman, Kalahari manganese fields, Northern Cape Province, South Africa. Size 3.8 x 3.5 x 3.2 cm

It occurs as a primary phase or as alteration of other manganese minerals during metamorphism of manganese deposits. Typical associated minerals include hausmannite, galaxite, braunite, pyrolusite, coronadite, hematite and magnetite. It is a ferrimagnetic substance, which is weakly attracted by a magnet.

It was first described in 1869 and named for the Jakobsberg Mine, Nordmark, Filipstad, Värmland, Sweden.
