= Manganese(II,III) oxide =

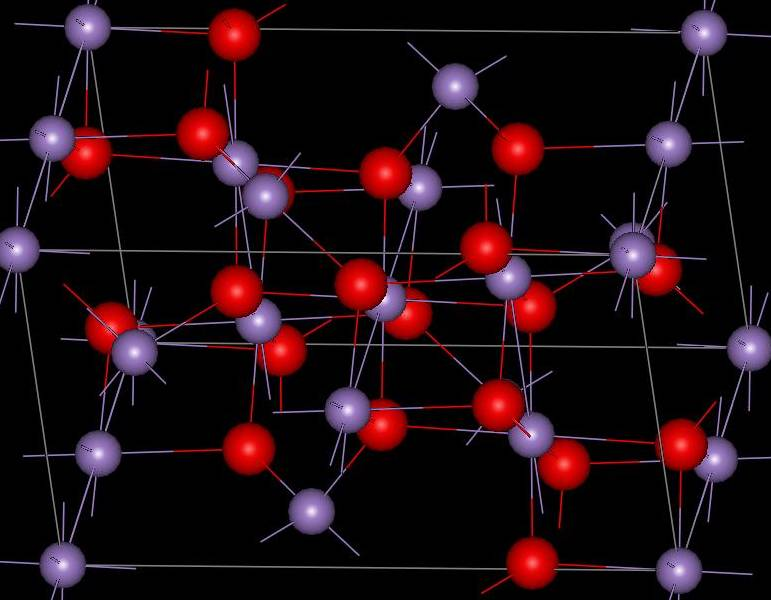

Names
- IUPAC name manganese(II) dimanganese(III) oxide
- Other names: Manganese tetroxide; Manganese oxide; Manganomanganic oxide; Trimanganese tetraoxide; Trimanganese tetroxide

Identifiers
CAS Number	1317-35-7
3D model (JSmol)	Interactive image
ChemSpider	34986713
ECHA InfoCard	100.013.879
EC Number	215-266-5
PubChem CID	90479253
RTECS number	OP0895000
UNII	70N6PQL9JS
CompTox Dashboard (EPA)	DTXSID9051660
- InChI: InChI=1S/3Mn.4O Key: GVNFAUMGUISVJW-UHFFFAOYSA-N
- SMILES: [Mn]=O.O=[Mn]O[Mn]=O

Properties
Chemical formula	Mn_{3}O_{4} MnO·Mn_{2}O_{3}
Molar mass	228.812 g/mol
Appearance	brownish-black powder
Density	4.86 g/cm^{3}
Melting point	1,567 °C (2,853 °F; 1,840 K)
Boiling point	2,847 °C (5,157 °F; 3,120 K)
Solubility in water	insoluble
Solubility	soluble in HCl
Magnetic susceptibility (χ)	+12,400·10^{−6} cm^{3}/mol

Structure
Crystal structure	Spinel (tetragonal), tI28
Space group	I4_{1}/amd, No. 141

Hazards
- GHS labelling
Pictograms	(GHS07: Exclamation mark) (GHS08: Health hazard)
Signal word	Warning
Hazard statements	H315, H319, H335, H361
Precautionary statements	P203, P261, P264, P264+P265, P271, P280, P302+P352, P304+P340, P305+P351+P338, P318, P319, P321, P332+P317, P337+P317, P362+P364, P403+P233, P405, P501
- NIOSH (US health exposure limits)
PEL (Permissible)	C 5 mg/m^{3}
REL (Recommended)	None established
IDLH (Immediate danger)	N.D.

Thermochemistry
Std molar entropy (S^{⦵}_{298})	149 J·mol^{−1}·K^{−1}
Std enthalpy of formation (Δ_{f}H^{⦵}_{298})	−1387 kJ·mol^{−1}
- Except where otherwise noted, data are given for materials in their standard state (at 25 °C [77 °F], 100 kPa). verify (what is ?) Infobox references

Manganese(II,III) oxide is the manganese oxide with the chemical compound with formula Mn_{3}O_{4}. Manganese is present in two oxidation states, +2 and +3, and the formula is sometimes written as MnO·Mn_{2}O_{3}. Mn_{3}O_{4} is found in nature as the mineral hausmannite.

== Preparation ==
Mn_{3}O_{4} formed when any manganese oxide is heated in air above 1000 °C. Considerable research has centred on producing nanocrystalline Mn_{3}O_{4} and various syntheses that involve oxidation of Mn^{II} or reduction of Mn^{VI}.

== Reactions ==
Mn_{3}O_{4} has been found to act as a catalyst for a range of reactions e.g. the oxidation of methane and carbon monoxide; the decomposition of NO, the reduction of nitrobenzene and the catalytic combustion of organic compounds.

== Structure ==
Mn_{3}O_{4} has the spinel structure, where the oxide ions are cubic close packed and the Mn^{II} occupy tetrahedral sites and the Mn^{III} octahedral sites. The structure is distorted due to the Jahn–Teller effect. At room temperature Mn_{3}O_{4} is paramagnetic, below 41-43 K, it is ferrimagnetic although this has been reported as reducing in nanocrystalline samples to around 39 K.

== Uses ==
Mn_{3}O_{4} is sometimes used as a starting material in the production of soft ferrites e.g. manganese zinc ferrite, and lithium manganese oxide, used in lithium batteries.

Manganese tetroxide can also be used as a weighting agent while drilling reservoir sections in oil and gas wells.
