= Spiegeleisen =

Ferromanganese alloy

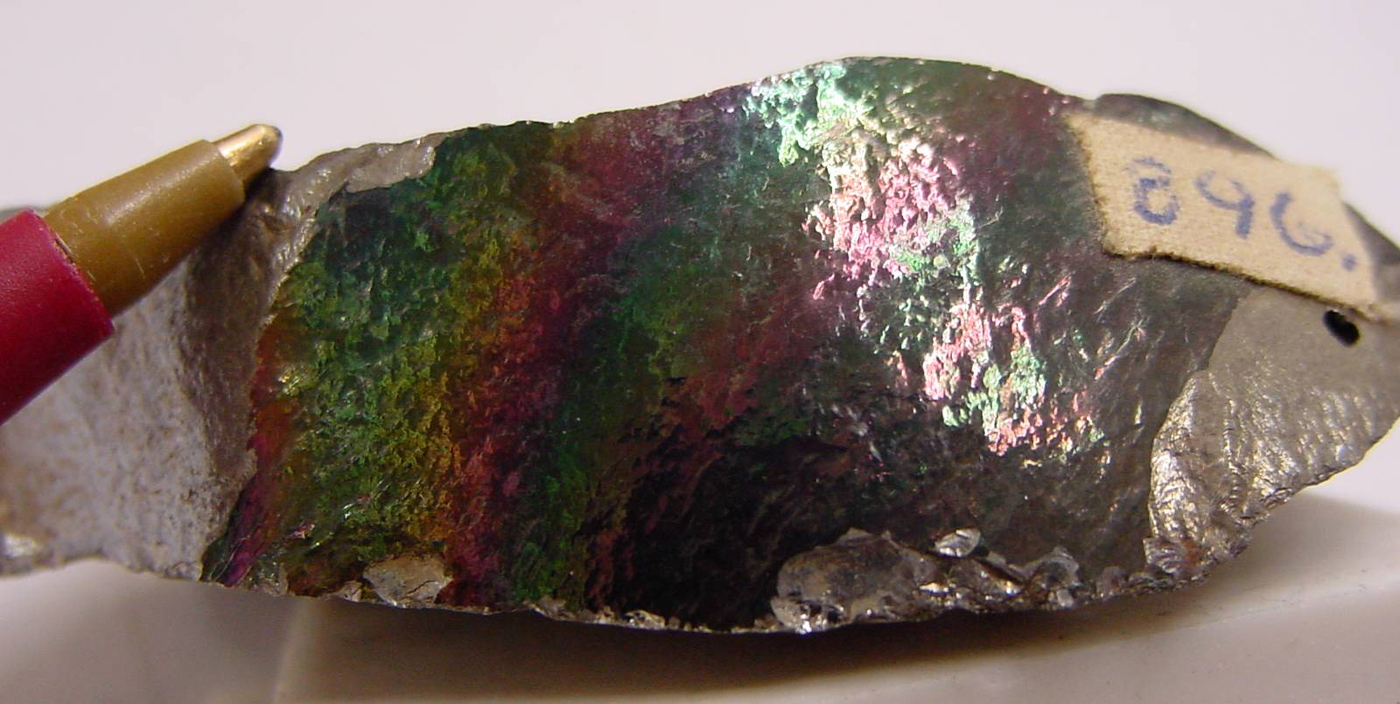
Spiegeleisen

Spiegeleisen (literally "mirror-iron", German: Spiegel—mirror or specular; Eisen—iron) is a ferromanganese alloy containing approximately 15% manganese and small quantities of carbon and silicon. Spiegeleisen is sometimes also referred to as specular pig iron, Spiegel iron, just Spiegel, or Bisalloy.

== Usage ==
Historically, this was the standard form in which manganese was traded and used in steel making. Manganese is useful in steel manufacture because it binds with phosphorus, sulfur, and silica, removing them (to a degree) from the iron. It was much used in conjunction with the Bessemer process both to introduce carbon and manganese, and also to reduce impurities.

== Manufacture ==
In the 19th-century spiegeleisen was made either by mixing iron ores with appropriate levels of manganese and smelting them directly, or by adding pyrolusite or manganite to previously smelted iron in a cupola furnace.

== See also ==
- Spathic iron ore
