= Wad (mineral) =

Porous secondary manganese oxyhydroxide

Wad is an old mining term for any black manganese oxide or hydroxide mineral-rich rock in the oxidized zone of various ore deposits. Typically closely associated with various iron oxides. Specific mineral varieties include pyrolusite, lithiophorite, nsutite, takanelite and vernadite. Wad can be considered to be the manganese equivalent to the iron mineraloid limonite.
