= Manganite =

Mineral composed of manganese oxide-hydroxide, MnO(OH)

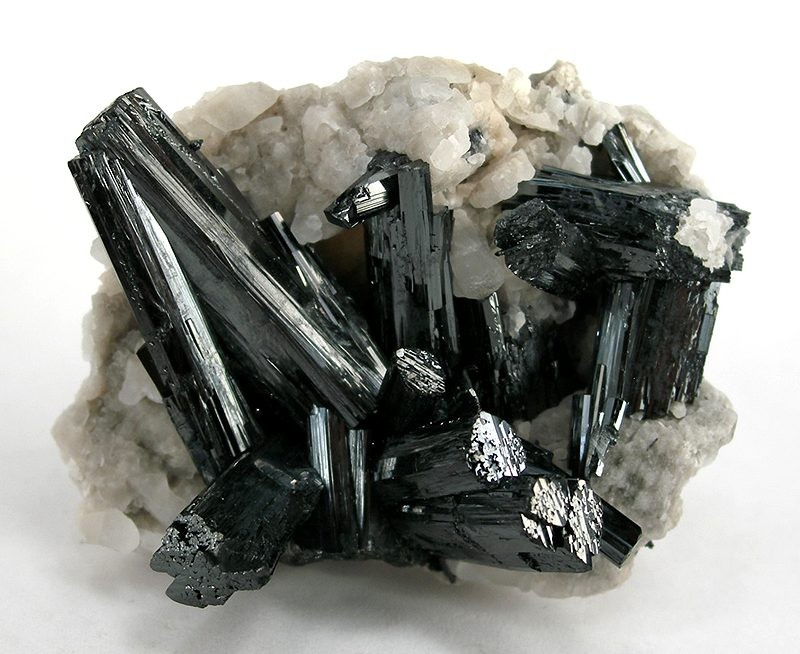
- Manganite, Ilfeld, Thuringia, Germany (size: 5.2×4.1×2.7 cm)

General
- Category: Oxide mineral
- Formula: MnO(OH)
- IMA symbol: Mnn
- Strunz classification: 4.FD.15
- Dana classification: 06.01.03.01
- Crystal system: Monoclinic
- Crystal class: Prismatic (2/m) (same H-M symbol)
- Space group: P2_{1}/c
- Unit cell: a = 5.3 Å, b = 5.278 Å, c = 5.307 Å; β = 114.36°; Z = 4

Identification
- Color: Dark steel-gray to black, reddish brown in transmitted light, gray-white with brownish tint, with blood-red internal reflections in reflected light
- Crystal habit: Slender prismatic crystals, massive to fibrous, pseudo-orthorhombic
- Twinning: {011}
- Cleavage: {010} perfect, {110} and {001} good
- Fracture: Uneven
- Tenacity: Brittle
- Mohs scale hardness: 4
- Luster: Sub-metallic
- Streak: Reddish brown to nearly black
- Diaphaneity: Opaque, transparent on thin edges
- Specific gravity: 4.29–4.34
- Optical properties: Biaxial (+)
- Refractive index: n_{α} = 2.250(2) n_{β} = 2.250(2) n_{γ} = 2.530(2)
- Birefringence: δ = 0.280, Bireflectance: distinct in grays
- Pleochroism: Faint
- 2V angle: Small
- Dispersion: Very strong

Manganite is a mineral composed of manganese oxide-hydroxide, MnO(OH), crystallizing in the monoclinic system (pseudo-orthorhombic). Crystals of manganite are prismatic and deeply striated parallel to their length; they are often grouped together in bundles. The color is dark steel-grey to iron-black, and the luster brilliant and submetallic. The streak is dark reddish brown. The hardness is 4, and the specific gravity is 4.3. There is a perfect cleavage parallel to the brachypinacoid, and less-perfect cleavage parallel to the prism faces. Twinned crystals are not infrequent.

The mineral contains 89.7% manganese sesquioxide; it dissolves in hydrochloric acid with evolution of chlorine.

== Occurrence ==
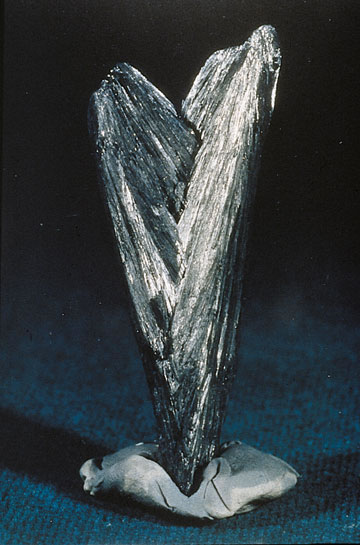
Manganite crystal group

Manganite occurs with other manganese oxides in deposits formed by circulating meteoric water in the weathering environment in clay deposits and laterites. It forms by low temperature hydrothermal action in veins in association with calcite, barite, and siderite. Often associated with pyrolusite, braunite, hausmannite and goethite.

Manganite occurs in specimens exhibiting good crystal form at Ilfeld in the Harz Mountains of Germany, where the mineral occurs with calcite and barite in veins traversing porphyry. Crystals have also been found at Ilmenau in Thuringia, Neukirch near Sélestat in Alsace (newkirkite), Granam near Towie in Aberdeenshire, and in Upton Pyne near Exeter, UK and Negaunee, Michigan, United States, and in the Pilbara of Western Australia. Good crystals have also been found at Atikokan, Ontario and Nova Scotia, Canada. As an ore of manganese it is much less abundant than pyrolusite or psilomelane.

Although described with various other names as early as 1772, the name manganite was first applied in a publication by W. Haidinger in 1827.

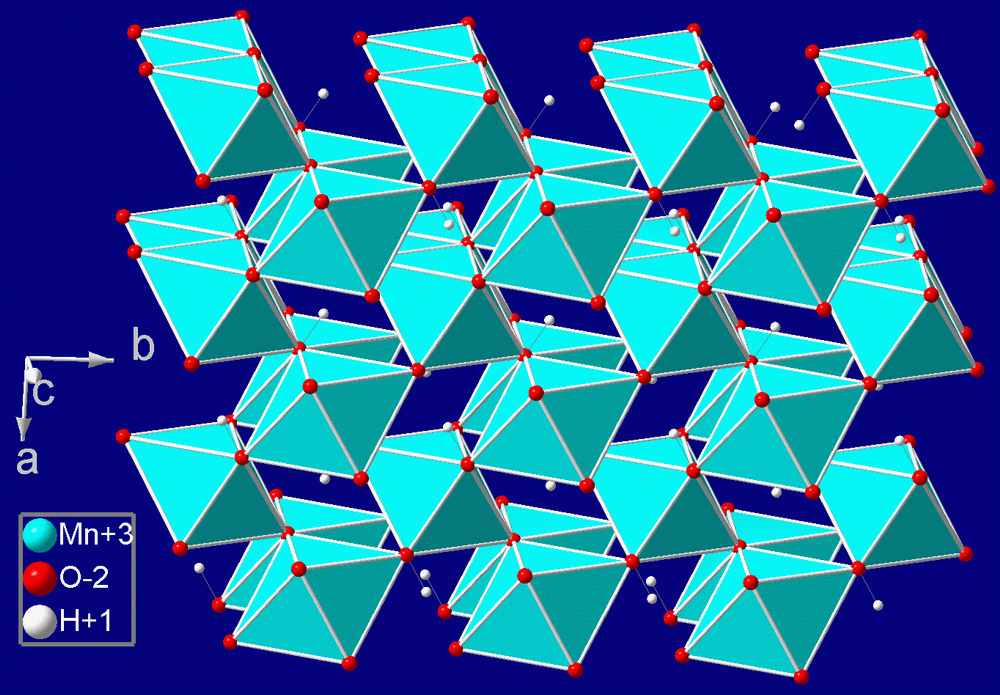
Crystal structure of manganite

== Applications ==
The mineral was used in prehistoric times as a pigment, by humans, and as a fire starter by Neanderthalers. Manganite is believed to have been used in prehistoric times to start a wood fire. Manganite lowers the combustion temperature of wood from 350 degrees Celsius to 250 degrees Celsius. Manganite powder has been a common find in Neanderthal archaeological sites.

== See also ==
- Manganese oxide
- Groutite
