= Mamatwan mine =

Manganese mine in South Africa

Coordinates: 27.3766°S 22.9813°E

- Interactive map of Mamatwan mine
- Location: Northern Cape, South Africa
- Products: Manganese

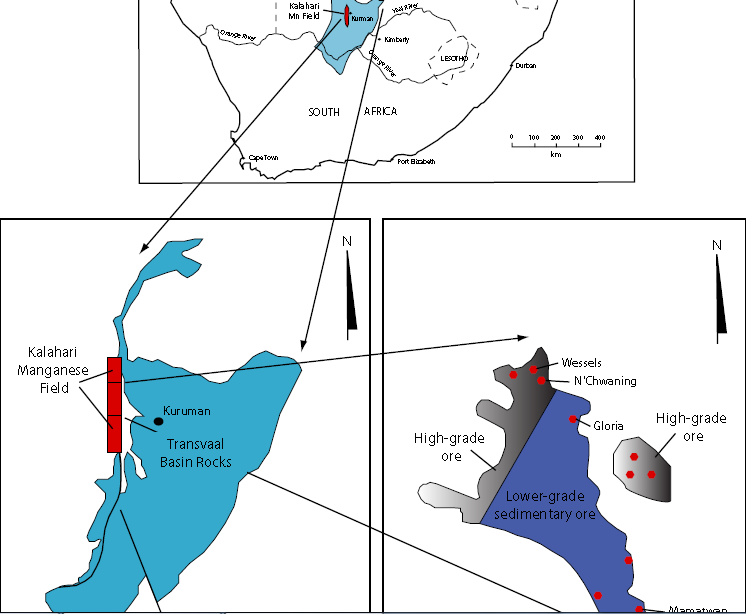
Kalahari Manganese Field

The Mamatwan mine is a mine located in the west of South Africa in Northern Cape. Mamatwan represents one of the largest manganese reserves in South Africa having estimated reserves of 433 million tonnes of manganese ore grading 40% manganese metal.

== See also ==
- Nchwaning mine
- Wessels mine
- Gloria mine
