= Ore =

Rock or sediment with valuable metals, minerals and elements

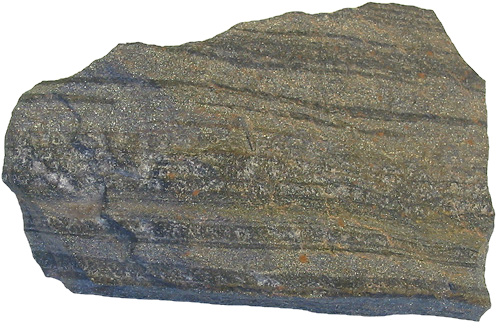
Iron ore (banded iron formation)

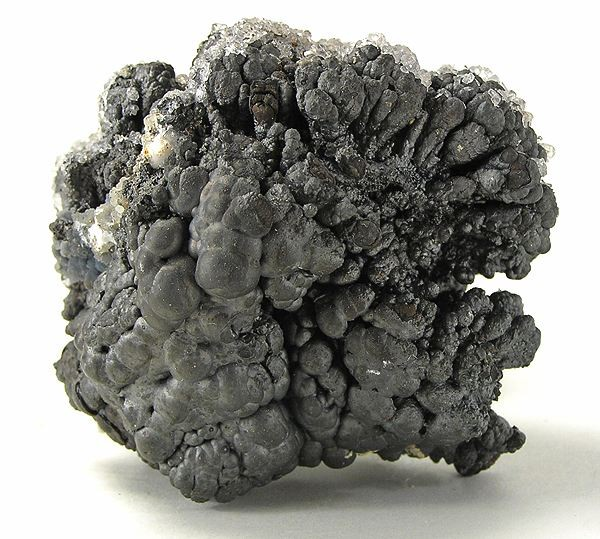
Manganese ore – psilomelane (size: 6.7 × 5.8 × 5.1 cm)

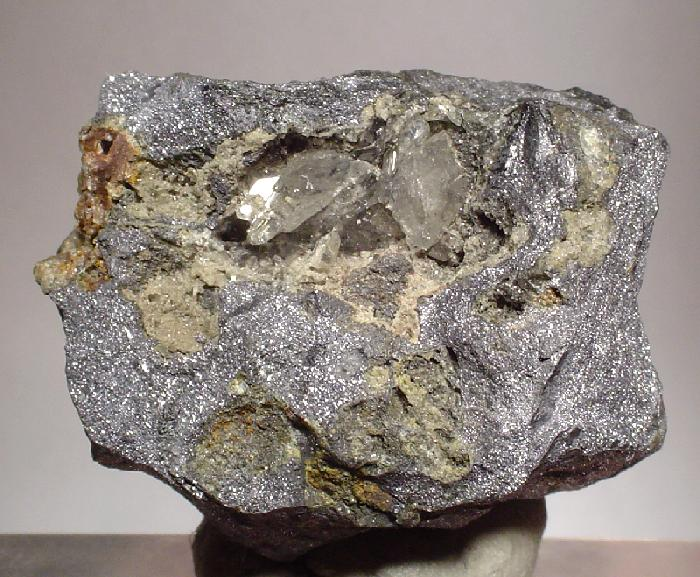
Lead ore – galena and anglesite (size: 4.8 × 4.0 × 3.0 cm)

Ore is natural rock or sediment that contains one or more valuable minerals, typically including metals, concentrated above background levels, and that is economically viable to mine and process. Ore grade refers to the concentration of the desired material it contains. The value of the metals or minerals a rock contains must be weighed against the cost of extraction to determine whether it is of sufficiently high grade to be worth mining and is therefore considered an ore. A complex ore is one containing more than one valuable mineral.

Minerals of interest are generally oxides, sulfides, silicates, or native metals such as copper or gold. Ore bodies are formed by a variety of geological processes generally referred to as ore genesis and can be classified based on their deposit type. Ore is extracted from the earth through mining and treated or refined, often via smelting, to extract the valuable metals or minerals. Some ores, depending on their composition, may pose threats to health or surrounding ecosystems.

The word ore is of Anglo-Saxon origin, meaning "lump of metal".

== Gangue and tailings ==
In most cases, an ore does not consist entirely of a single mineral, but is mixed with other valuable minerals and with unwanted or valueless rocks and minerals. The part of an ore that is not economically desirable and that cannot be avoided in mining is known as gangue. The valuable ore minerals are separated from the gangue minerals by froth flotation, gravity concentration, electric or magnetic methods, and other operations known collectively as mineral processing or ore dressing.

Mineral processing consists of first liberation, to free the ore from the gangue, and concentration to separate the desired mineral(s) from it. Once processed, the gangue is known as tailings, which are useless but potentially harmful materials produced in great quantity, especially from lower grade deposits.

== Ore deposits ==
An ore deposit is an economically significant accumulation of minerals within a host rock. This is distinct from a mineral resource in that it is a mineral deposit occurring in high enough concentration to be economically viable. An ore deposit is one occurrence of a particular ore type. Most ore deposits are named according to their location, or after a discoverer (e.g. the Kambalda nickel shoots are named after drillers), or after some whimsy, a historical figure, a prominent person, a city or town from which the owner came, something from mythology (such as the name of a god or goddess) or the code name of the resource company which found it (e.g. MKD-5 was the in-house name for the Mount Keith nickel sulphide deposit).

=== Classification ===
Ore deposits are classified according to various criteria developed via the study of economic geology, or ore genesis. The following is a general categorization of the main ore deposit types:

=== Magmatic deposits ===
Magmatic deposits are ones which originate directly from magma

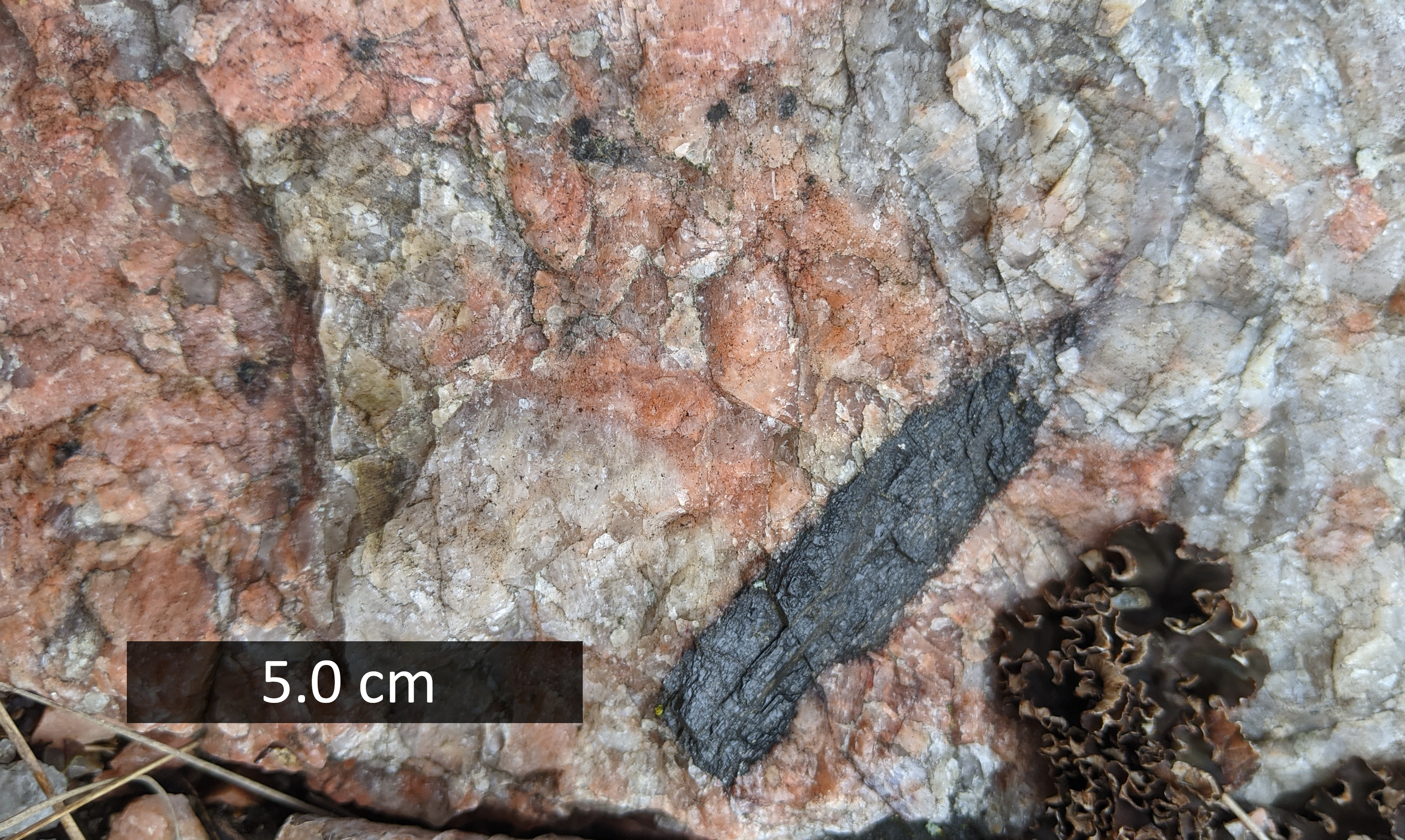
Granitic pegmatite composed of plagioclase and K-feldspar, large hornblende crystal present. Scale bar is 5.0 cm

- Pegmatites are very coarse grained, igneous rocks. They crystallize slowly at great depth beneath the surface, leading to their very large crystal sizes. Most are of granitic composition. They are a large source of industrial minerals such as quartz, feldspar, spodumene, petalite, and rare lithophile elements.
- Carbonatites are an igneous rock whose volume is made up of over 50% carbonate minerals. They are produced from mantle derived magmas, typically at continental rift zones. They contain more rare earth elements than any other igneous rock, and as such are a major source of light rare earth elements.
- Magmatic Sulfide Deposits form from mantle melts which rise upwards, and gain sulfur through interaction with the crust. This causes the sulfide minerals present to be immiscible, precipitating out when the melt crystallizes. Magmatic sulfide deposits can be subdivided into two groups by their dominant ore element:
  - Ni-Cu, found in komatiites, anorthosite complexes, and flood basalts. This also includes the Sudbury Nickel Basin, the only known astrobleme source of such ore.
  - Platinum Group Elements (PGE) from large mafic intrusions and tholeiitic rock.
- Stratiform Chromites are strongly linked to PGE magmatic sulfide deposits. These highly mafic intrusions are a source of chromite, the only chromium ore. They are so named due to their strata-like shape and formation via layered magmatic injection into the host rock. Chromium is usually located within the bottom of the intrusion. They are typically found within intrusions in continental cratons, the most famous example being the Bushveld Complex in South Africa.
- Podiform Chromitites are found in ultramafic oceanic rocks resulting from complex magma mixing. They are hosted in serpentine and dunite rich layers and are another source of chromite.
- Kimberlites are a primary source for diamonds. They originate from depths of 150 km in the mantle and are mostly composed of crustal xenocrysts, high amounts of magnesium, other trace elements, gases, and in some cases diamond.

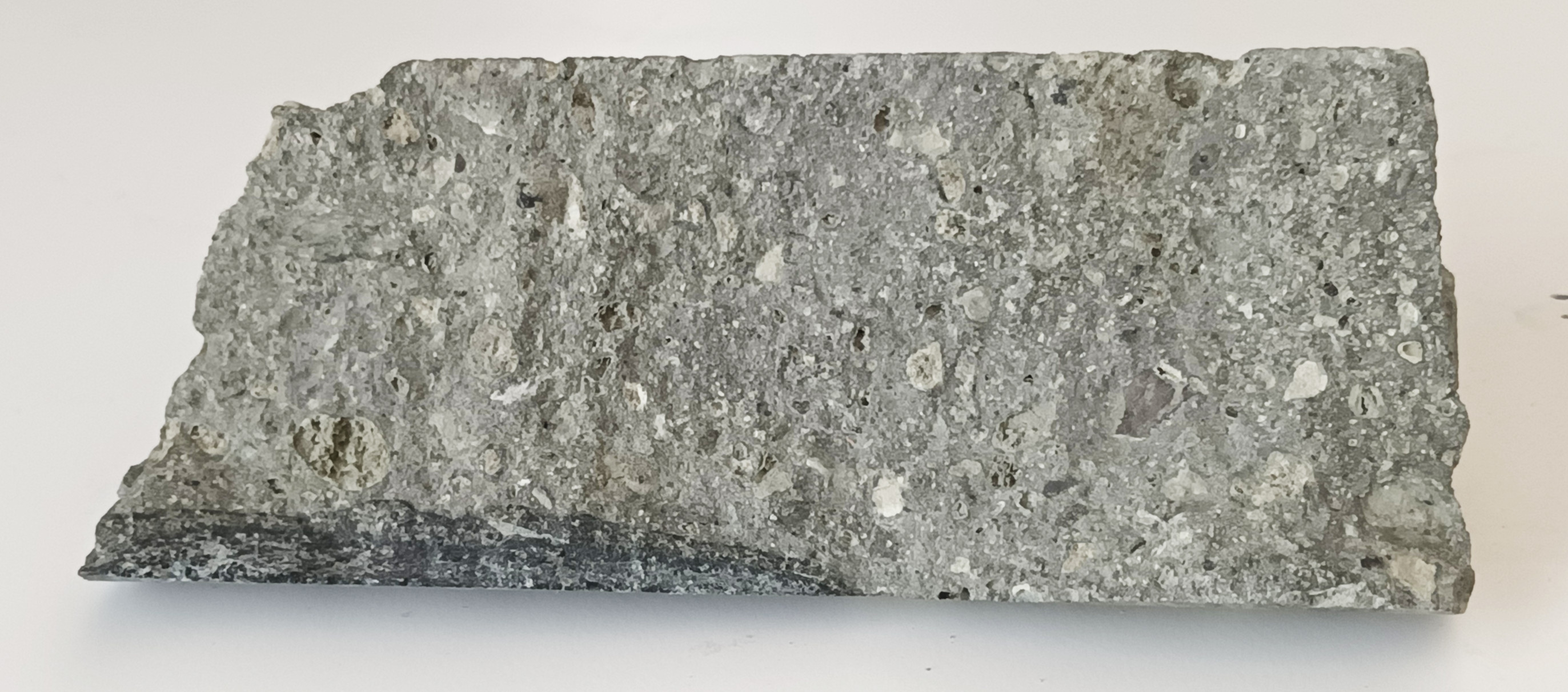
Piece of kimberlite. 11.1 cm x 4.5 cm

=== Metamorphic deposits ===
These are ore deposits which form as a direct result of metamorphism.

- Skarns occur in numerous geologic settings worldwide. They are silicates derived from the recrystallization of carbonates like limestone through contact or regional metamorphism, or fluid related metasomatic events. Not all are economic, but those with potential value are classified depending on the dominant element such as Ca, Fe, Mg, or Mn among many others. They are one of the most diverse and abundant mineral deposits. As such they are classified solely by their common mineralogy, mainly garnets and pyroxenes.
- Greisens, like skarns, are a metamorphosed silicate, quartz-mica mineral deposit. Formed from a granitic protolith due to alteration by intruding magmas, they are large ore sources of tin and tungsten in the form of wolframite, cassiterite, stannite and scheelite.

=== Porphyry copper deposits ===
These are the leading source of copper ore. Porphyry copper deposits form along convergent boundaries and are thought to originate from the partial melting of subducted oceanic plates and subsequent concentration of Cu, driven by oxidation. These are large, round, disseminated deposits containing on average 0.8% copper by weight.

Hydrothermal

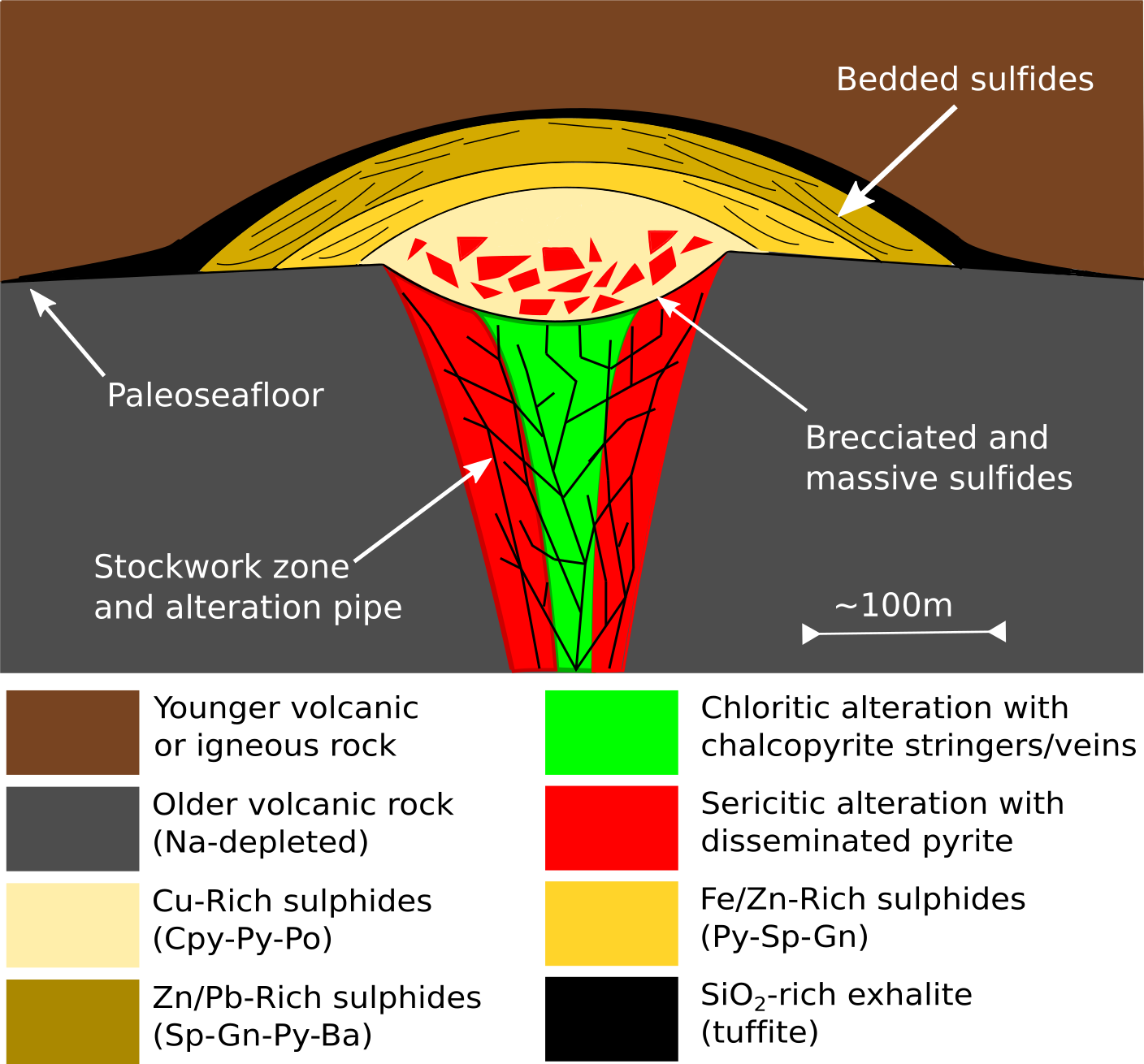
A cross-section of a typical volcanogenic massive sulfide (VMS) ore deposit

Hydrothermal deposits are a large source of ore. They form as a result of the precipitation of dissolved ore constituents out of fluids.

- Mississippi Valley-Type (MVT) deposits precipitate from relatively cool, basal brinal fluids within carbonate strata. These are sources of lead and zinc sulphide ore.
- Sediment-Hosted Stratiform Copper Deposits (SSC) form when copper sulphides precipitate out of brinal fluids into sedimentary basins near the equator. These are the second most common source of copper ore after porphyry copper deposits, supplying 20% of the worlds copper in addition to silver and cobalt.
- Volcanogenic massive sulphide (VMS) deposits form on the seafloor from precipitation of metal rich solutions, typically associated with hydrothermal activity. They take the general form of a large sulphide rich mound above disseminated sulphides and viens. VMS deposits are a major source of zinc (Zn), copper (Cu), lead (Pb), silver (Ag), and gold (Au).
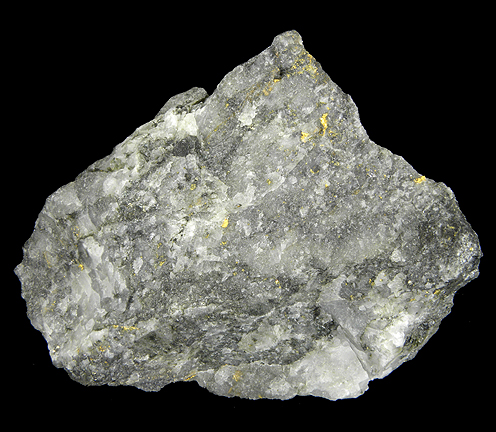
  Gold ore (size: 7.5 × 6.1 × 4.1 cm)
- Sedimentary exhalative sulphide deposits (SEDEX) are a copper sulphide ore which form in the same manor as VMS from metal rich brine but are hosted within sedimentary rocks and are not directly related to volcanism.
- Orogenic gold deposits are a bulk source for gold, with 75% of gold production originating from orogenic gold deposits. Formation occurs during late stage mountain building (see orogeny) where metamorphism forces gold containing fluids into joints and fractures where they precipitate. These tend to be strongly correlated with quartz veins.
- Epithermal vein deposits form in the shallow crust from concentration of metal bearing fluids into veins and stockworks where conditions favour precipitation. These volcanic related deposits are a source of gold and silver ore, the primary precipitants.

=== Sedimentary deposits ===
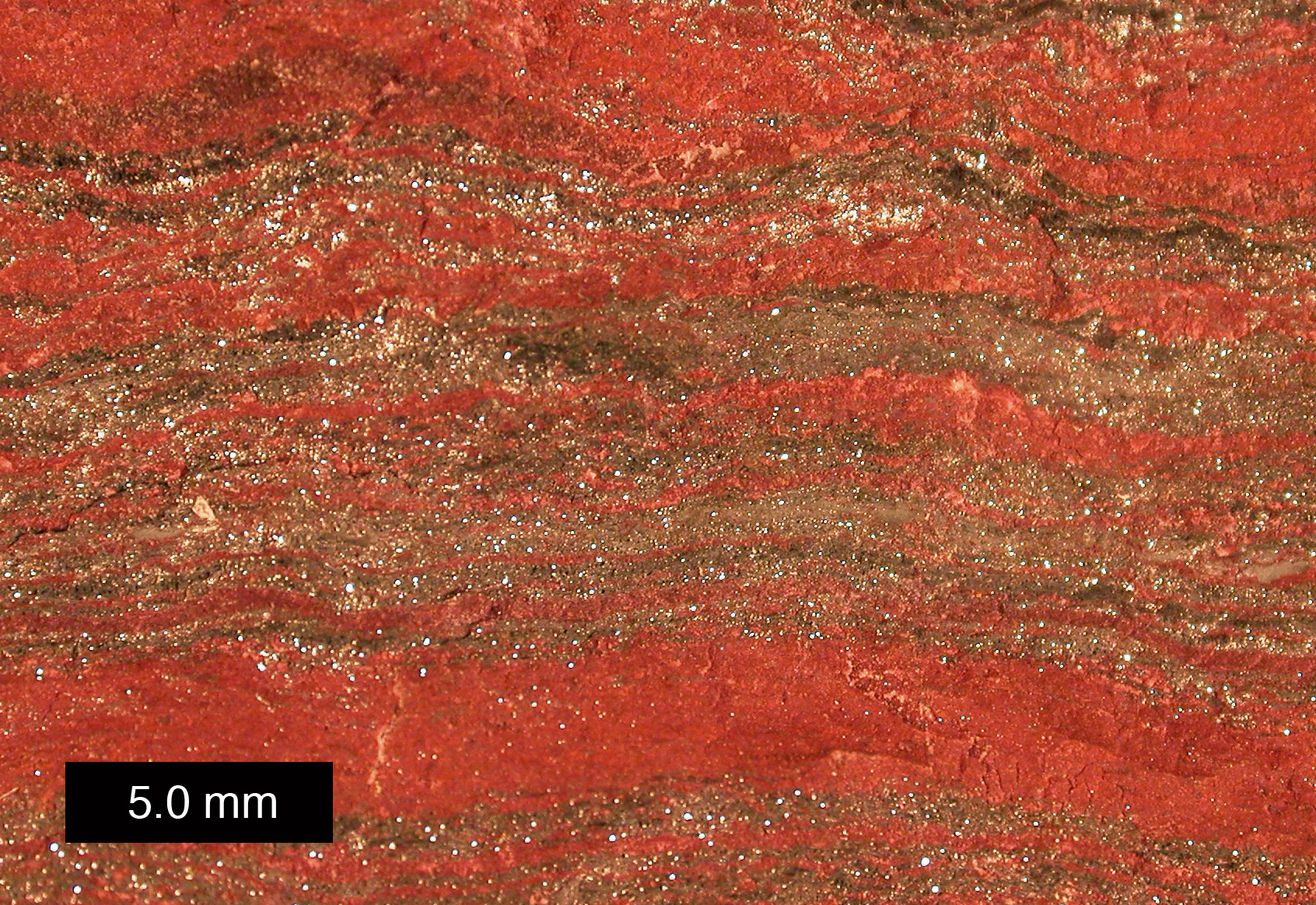
Magnified view of banded iron formation specimen from Upper Michigan. Scale bar is 5.0 mm.

Laterites form from the weathering of highly mafic rock near the equator. They can form in as little as one million years and are a source of iron (Fe), manganese (Mn), and aluminum (Al). They may also be a source of nickel and cobalt when the parent rock is enriched in these elements.

Banded iron formations (BIFs) are the highest concentration of any single metal available. They are composed of chert beds alternating between high and low iron concentrations. Their deposition occurred early in Earth's history when the atmospheric composition was significantly different from today. Iron rich water is thought to have upwelled where it oxidized to Fe (III) in the presence of early photosynthetic plankton producing oxygen. This iron then precipitated out and deposited on the ocean floor. The banding is thought to be a result of changing plankton population.

Sediment Hosted Copper forms from the precipitation of a copper rich oxidized brine into sedimentary rocks. These are a source of copper primarily in the form of copper-sulfide minerals.

Placer deposits are the result of weathering, transport, and subsequent concentration of a valuable mineral via water or wind. They are typically sources of gold (Au), platinum group elements (PGE), sulfide minerals, tin (Sn), tungsten (W), and rare-earth elements (REEs). A placer deposit is considered alluvial if formed via river, colluvial if by gravity, and eluvial when close to their parent rock.

=== Manganese nodules ===
Polymetallic nodules, also called manganese nodules, are mineral concretions on the sea floor formed of concentric layers of iron and manganese hydroxides around a core. They are formed by a combination of diagenetic and sedimentary precipitation at the estimated rate of about a centimeter over several million years. The average diameter of a polymetallic nodule is between 3 and 10 cm (1 and 4 in) in diameter and are characterized by enrichment in iron, manganese, heavy metals, and rare earth element content when compared to the Earth's crust and surrounding sediment. The proposed mining of these nodules via remotely operated ocean floor trawling robots has raised a number of ecological concerns.

== Extraction ==
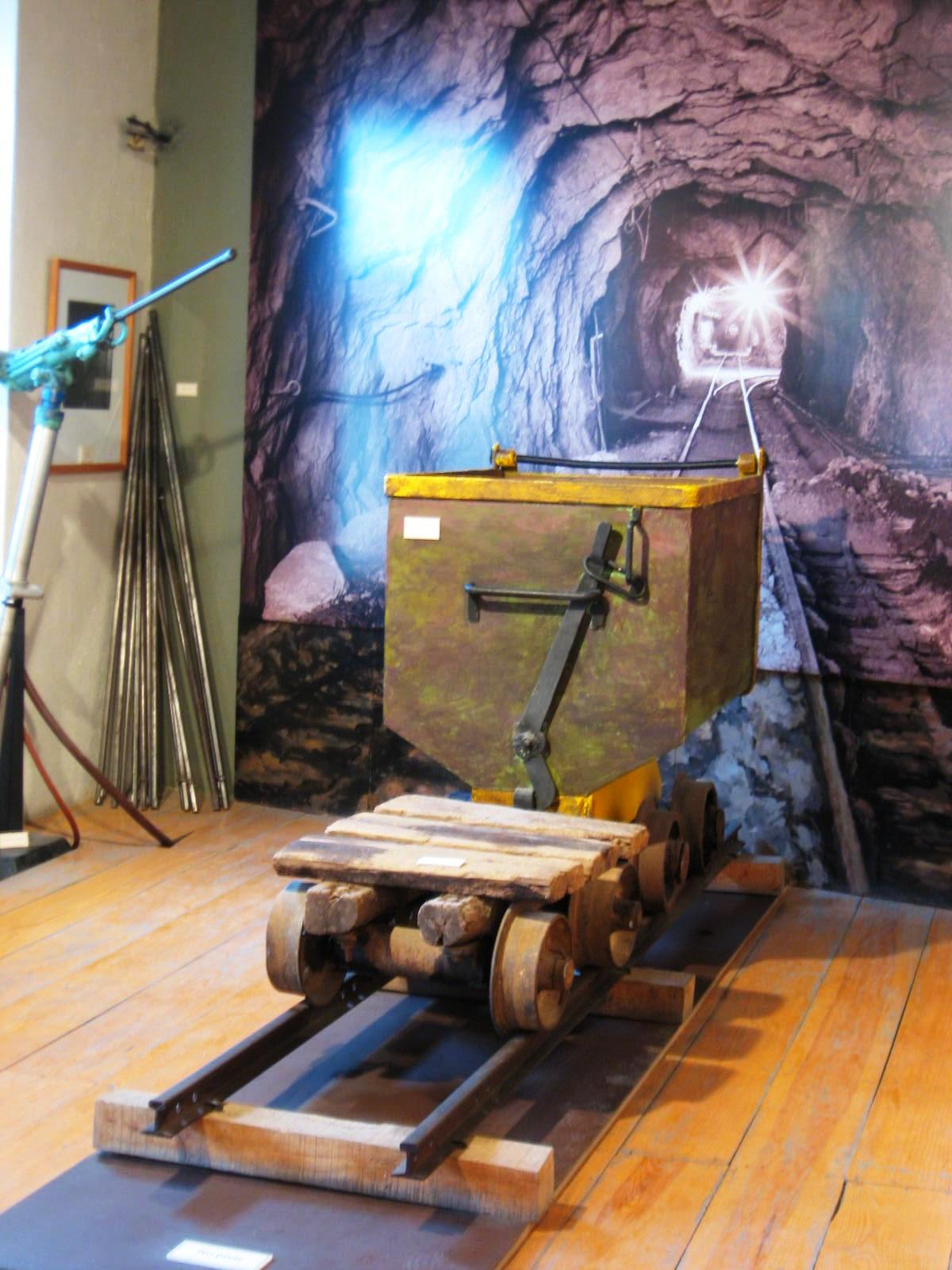
Minecart on display at the Historic Archive and Museum of Mining in Pachuca, Mexico

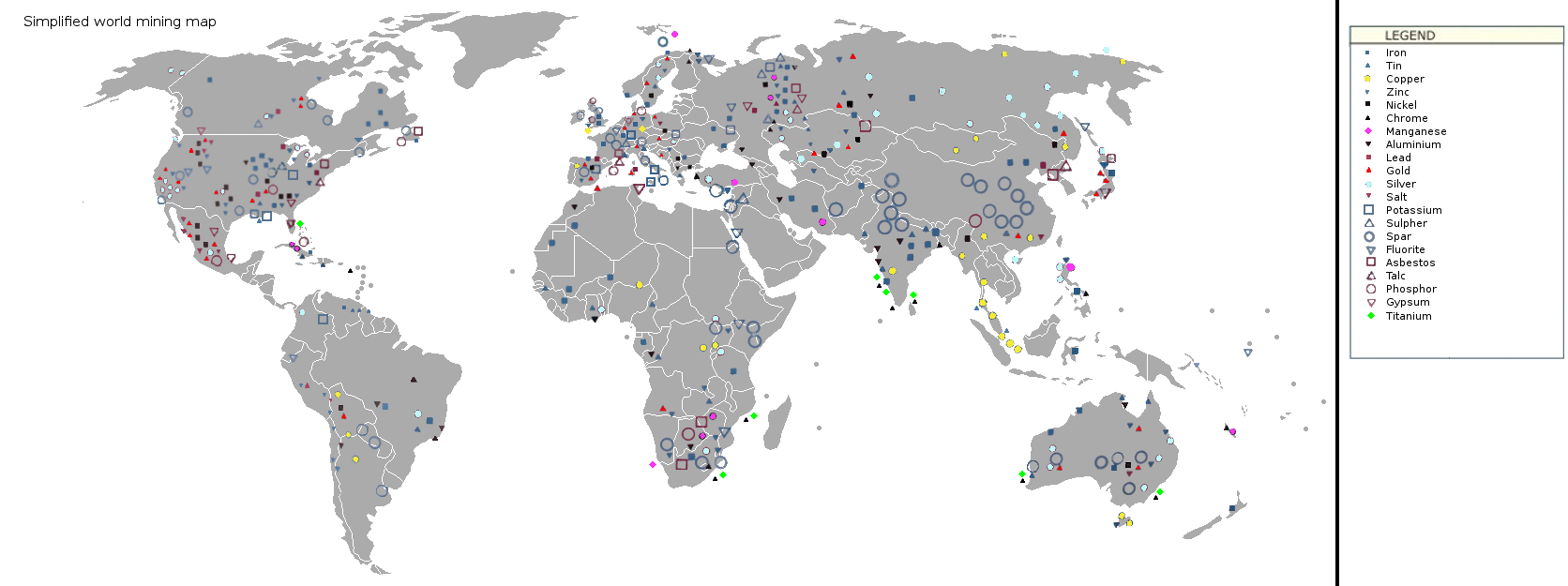
Some ore deposits in the world

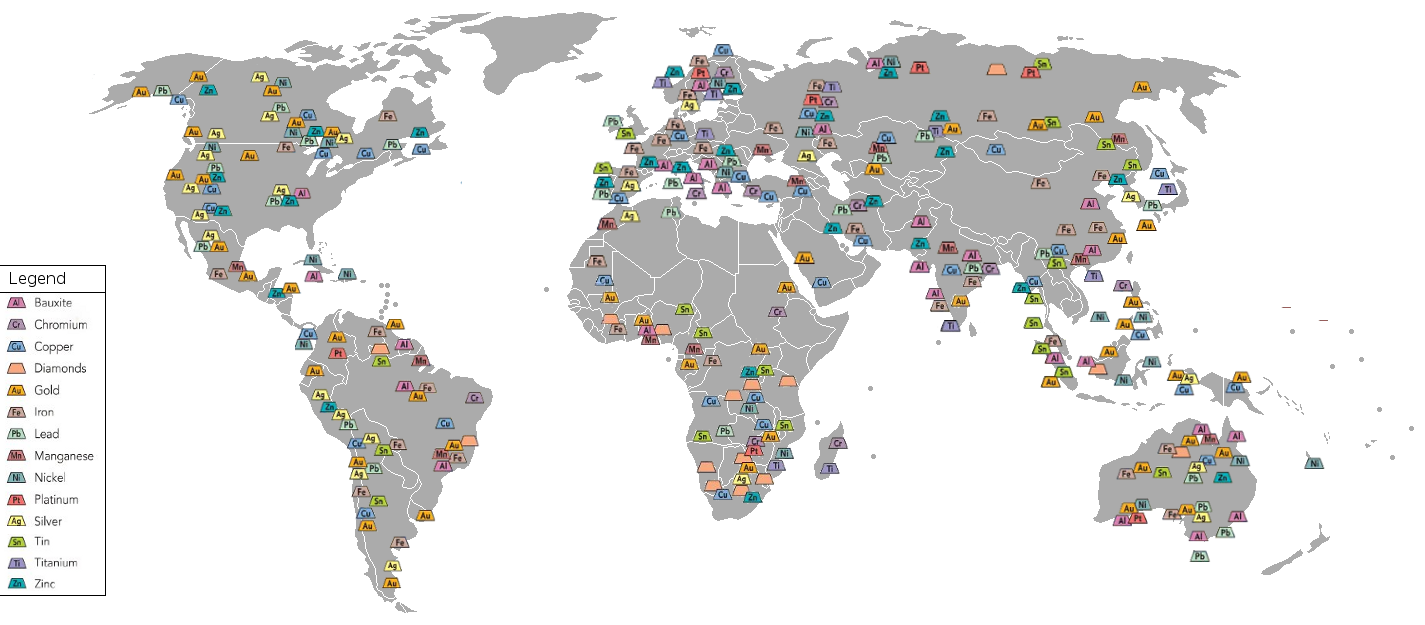
Some additional ore deposits in the world

The extraction of ore deposits generally follows these steps. Progression from stages 1–3 will see a continuous disqualification of potential ore bodies as more information is obtained on their viability:

1. Prospecting to find where an ore is located. The prospecting stage generally involves mapping, geophysical survey techniques (aerial and/or ground-based surveys), geochemical sampling, and preliminary drilling.
2. After a deposit is discovered, exploration is conducted to define its extent and value via further mapping and sampling techniques such as targeted diamond drilling to intersect the potential ore body. This exploration stage determines ore grade, tonnage, and if the deposit is a viable economic resource.
3. A feasibility study then considers the theoretical implications of the potential mining operation in order to determine if it should move ahead with development. This includes evaluating the economically recoverable portion of the deposit, marketability and payability of the ore concentrates, engineering, milling and infrastructure costs, finance and equity requirements, potential environmental impacts, political implications, and a cradle to grave analysis from the initial excavation all the way through to reclamation. Multiple experts from differing fields must then approve the study before the project can move on to the next stage. Depending on the size of the project, a pre-feasibility study is sometimes first performed to decide preliminary potential and if a much costlier full feasibility study is even warranted.
4. Development begins once an ore body has been confirmed economically viable and involves steps to prepare for its extraction such as building of a mine plant and equipment.
5. Production can then begin and is the operation of the mine in an active sense. The time a mine is active is dependent on its remaining reserves and profitability. The extraction method used is entirely dependent on the deposit type, geometry, and surrounding geology. Methods can be generally categorized into surface mining such as open pit or strip mining, and underground mining such as block caving, cut and fill, and stoping.
6. Reclamation, once the mine is no longer operational, makes the land where a mine had been suitable for future use.

With rates of ore discovery in a steady decline since the mid 20th century, it is thought that most surface level, easily accessible sources have been exhausted. This means progressively lower grade deposits must be turned to, and new methods of extraction must be developed.

== Hazards ==
Some ores contain heavy metals, toxins, radioactive isotopes and other potentially negative compounds which may pose a risk to the environment or health. The exact effects an ore and its tailings have is dependent on the minerals present. Tailings of particular concern are those of older mines, as containment and remediation methods in the past were next to non-existent, leading to high levels of leaching into the surrounding environment. Mercury and arsenic are two ore related elements of particular concern. Additional elements found in ore which may have adverse health affects in organisms include iron, lead, uranium, zinc, silicon, titanium, sulfur, nitrogen, platinum, and chromium. Exposure to these elements may result in respiratory and cardiovascular problems and neurological issues. These are of particular danger to aquatic life if dissolved in water. Ores such as those of sulphide minerals may severely increase the acidity of their immediate surroundings and of water, with numerous, long lasting impacts on ecosystems. When water becomes contaminated it may transport these compounds far from the tailings site, greatly increasing the affected range.

Uranium ores and those containing other radioactive elements may pose a significant threat if leaving occurs and isotope concentration increases above background levels. Radiation can have severe, long lasting environmental impacts and cause irreversible damage to living organisms.

== History ==
Metallurgy began with the direct working of native metals such as gold, lead and copper. Placer deposits, for example, would have been the first source of native gold. The first exploited ores were copper oxides such as malachite and azurite, over 7000 years ago at Çatalhöyük. These were the easiest to work, with relatively limited mining and basic requirements for smelting. It is believed they were once much more abundant on the surface than today. After this, copper sulphides would have been turned to as oxide resources depleted and the Bronze Age progressed. Lead production from galena smelting may have been occurring at this time as well.

The smelting of arsenic-copper sulphides would have produced the first bronze alloys. The majority of bronze creation however required tin, and thus the exploitation of cassiterite, the main tin source, began. Some 3000 years ago, the smelting of iron ores began in Mesopotamia. Iron oxide is quite abundant on the surface and forms from a variety of processes.

Until the 18th century gold, copper, lead, iron, silver, tin, arsenic and mercury were the only metals mined and used. In recent decades, Rare Earth Elements have been increasingly exploited for various high-tech applications. This has led to an ever-growing search for REE ore and novel ways of extracting said elements.

== Trade ==
Ores (metals) are traded internationally and comprise a sizeable portion of international trade in raw materials both in value and volume. This is because the worldwide distribution of ores is unequal and dislocated from locations of peak demand and from smelting infrastructure.

Most base metals (copper, lead, zinc, nickel) are traded internationally on the London Metal Exchange, with smaller stockpiles and metals exchanges monitored by the COMEX and NYMEX exchanges in the United States and the Shanghai Futures Exchange in China. The global Chromium market is currently dominated by the United States and China.

Iron ore is traded between customer and producer, though various benchmark prices are set quarterly between the major mining conglomerates and the major consumers, and this sets the stage for smaller participants.

Other, lesser, commodities do not have international clearing houses and benchmark prices, with most prices negotiated between suppliers and customers one-on-one. This generally makes determining the price of ores of this nature opaque and difficult. Such metals include lithium, niobium-tantalum, bismuth, antimony and rare earths. Most of these commodities are also dominated by one or two major suppliers with >60% of the world's reserves. China is currently leading in world production of Rare Earth Elements.

The World Bank reports that China was the top importer of ores and metals in 2005 followed by the US and Japan.

== Important ore minerals ==
For detailed petrographic descriptions of ore minerals see Tables for the Determination of Common Opaque Minerals by Spry and Gedlinske (1987). Below are the major economic ore minerals and their deposits, grouped by primary elements.

Type	Mineral	Symbol/formula	Uses	Source(s)	Ref
Metal ore minerals	Aluminum	Al	Alloys, conductive materials, lightweight applications	Gibbsite (Al(OH)_{3}) and aluminium hydroxide oxide, which are found in laterites. Also Bauxite and Barite	'
Metal ore minerals	Antimony	Sb	Alloys, flame retardation	Stibnite (Sb_{2}S_{3})	
Metal ore minerals	Beryllium	Be	Metal alloys, in the nuclear industry, in electronics	Beryl (Be_{3}Al_{2}Si_{6}O_{18}), found in granitic pegmatites	
Metal ore minerals	Bismuth	Bi	Alloys, pharmaceuticals	Native bismuth and bismuthinite (Bi_{2}S_{3}) with sulphide ores	
Metal ore minerals	Cesium	Cs	Photoelectrics, pharmaceuticals	Lepidolite (K(Li, Al)_{3} (Si, Al)_{4}O_{10} (OH,F)_{2}) from pegmatites	
Metal ore minerals	Chromium	Cr	Alloys, electroplating, colouring agents	Chromite (FeCr_{2}O_{4}) from stratiform and podiform chromitites	
Metal ore minerals	Cobalt	Co	Alloys, chemical catalysts, cemented carbide	Smaltite (CoAs_{2}) in veins with cobaltite; silver, nickel and calcite; cobaltite (CoAsS) in veins with smaltite, silver, nickel and calcite; carrollite (CuCo_{2}S_{4}) and linnaeite (Co_{3}S_{4}) as constituents of copper ore; and linnaeite	
Metal ore minerals	Copper	Cu	Alloys, high conductivity, corrosion resistance	Sulphide minerals, including chalcopyrite (CuFeS_{2}; primary ore mineral) in sulphide deposits, or porphyry copper deposits; covellite (CuS); chalcocite (Cu_{2}S; secondary with other sulphide minerals) with native copper and cuprite deposits and bornite (Cu_{5}FeS_{4}; secondary with other sulphide minerals); Oxidized minerals, including malachite (Cu_{2}CO_{3}(OH)_{2}) in the oxidized zone of copper deposits; cuprite (Cu_{2}O; secondary mineral ); and azurite (Cu_{3}(CO_{3})_{2}(OH)_{2}; secondary)	
Metal ore minerals	Gold	Au	Electronics, jewellery, dentistry	Placer deposits, quartz grains	
Metal ore minerals	Iron	Fe	Industry use, construction, steel	Hematite (Fe_{2}O_{3}; primary source) in banded iron formations, veins, and igneous rock; magnetite (Fe_{3}O_{4}) in igneous and metamorphic rocks; goethite (FeO(OH); secondary to hematite); limonite (FeO(OH)nH_{2}O; secondary to hematite)	
Metal ore minerals	Lead	Pb	Alloys, pigmentation, batteries, corrosion resistance, radiation shielding	Galena (PbS) in veins with other sulphide materials and in pegmatites; cerussite (PbCO_{3}) in oxidized lead zones along with galena	
Metal ore minerals	Lithium	Li	Metal production, batteries, ceramics	Spodumene (LiAlSi_{2}O_{6}) in pegmatites Lithium is also extracted in commercially recoverable quantities from subsurface brines.	
Metal ore minerals	Manganese	Mn	Steel alloys, chemical manufacturing	Pyrolusite (MnO_{2}) in oxidized manganese zones like laterites and skarns; manganite (MnO(OH)) and braunite (3Mn_{2}O_{3} MnSiO_{3}) with pyrolusite	
Metal ore minerals	Mercury	Hg	Scientific instruments, electrical applications, paint, solvent, pharmaceuticals	Cinnabar (HgS) in sedimentary fractures with other sulphide minerals	
Metal ore minerals	Molybdenum	Mo	Alloys, electronics, industry	Molybdenite (MoS_{2}) in porphyry deposits, powellite (CaMoO_{4}) in hydrothermal deposits	
Metal ore minerals	Nickel	Ni	Alloys, food and pharmaceutical applications, corrosion resistance	Pentlandite (Fe,Ni)_{9}S_{8} with other sulphide minerals; garnierite (NiMg) with chromite and in laterites; niccolite (NiAs) in magmatic sulphide deposits	
Metal ore minerals	Niobium	Nb	Alloys, corrosion resistance	Pyrochlore (Na,Ca)_{2}Nb_{2}O_{6}(OH,F) and columbite ((Fe^{II},Mn^{II})Nb_{2}O_{6}) in granitic pegmatites	
Metal ore minerals	Platinum Group	Pt	Dentistry, jewelry, chemical applications, corrosion resistance, electronics	With chromite and copper ore, in placer deposits; sperrylite (PtAs_{2}) in sulphide deposits and gold veins	
Metal ore minerals	Rare-earth elements	La, Ce, Pr, Nd, Pm, Sm, Eu, Gd, Tb, Dy, Ho, Er, Tm, Yb, Lu, Sc, Y	Permanent magnets, batteries, glass treatment, petroleum industry, micro-electronics, alloys, nuclear applications, corrosion protection (La and Ce are the most widely applicable)	Bastnäsite (REECO_{3}F; for Ce, La, Pr, Nd) in carbonatites; monazite (REEPO_{4}; for La, Ce, Pr, Nd) in placer deposits; xenotime (YPO_{4}; for Y) in pegmatites; eudialyte (Na_{15}Ca_{6}(Fe,Mn)_{3}Zr_{3}SiO(O,OH,H_{2}O)_{3} (Si_{3}O_{9})_{2}(Si_{9}O_{27})_{2}(OH,Cl)_{2}) in igneous rocks; allanite ((REE,Ca,Y)_{2}(Al,Fe^{2+},Fe^{3+})_{3}(SiO4)3(OH)) in pegmatites and carbonatites	
Metal ore minerals	Rhenium	Re	Catalyst, temperature applications	Molybdenite (MoS_{2}) in porphyry deposits	
Metal ore minerals	Silver	Ag	Jewellery, glass, photo-electric applications, batteries	Sulfide deposits; Argentite (Ag_{2}S; secondary to copper, lead and zinc ores)	
Metal ore minerals	Tin	Sn	Solder, bronze, cans, pewter	Cassiterite (SnO_{2}) in placer and magmatic deposits	
Metal ore minerals	Titanium	Ti	Aerospace, industrial tubing	Ilmenite (FeTiO_{3}) and rutile (TiO_{2}) economically sourced from placer deposits with REEs	
Metal ore minerals	Tungsten	W	Filaments, electronics, lighting	Wolframite ((Fe,Mn)WO_{4}) and scheelite (CaWO_{4}) in skarns and in porphyry along with sulphide minerals	
Metal ore minerals	Uranium	U	Nuclear fuel, ammunition, radiation shielding	Pitchblende (UO_{2}) in uraninite placer deposits; carnotite (K_{2}(UO_{2})_{2}(VO_{4})_{2} 3H_{2}O) in placer deposits	
Metal ore minerals	Vanadium	V	Alloys, catalysts, glass colouring, batteries	Patronite (VS_{4}) with sulphide minerals; roscoelite (K(V,Al,Mg)_{2} AlSi_{3}O_{10}(OH)_{2}) in epithermal gold deposits	
Metal ore minerals	Zinc	Zn	Corrosion protection, alloys, various industrial compounds	Sphalerite ((Zn,Fe)S) with other sulphide minerals in vein deposits; smithsonite (ZnCO_{3}) in oxidized zone of zinc bearing sulphide deposits	
Metal ore minerals	Zirconium	Zr	Alloys, nuclear reactors, corrosion resistance	Zircon (ZrSiO_{4}) in igneous rocks and in placers	
Non-metal ore minerals	Fluorospar	CaF_{2}	Steelmaking, optical equipment	Hydrothermal veins and pegmatites	
Non-metal ore minerals	Graphite	C	Lubricant, industrial molds, paint	Pegmatites and metamorphic rocks	
Non-metal ore minerals	Gypsum	CaSO_{4}2H_{2}O	Fertilizer, filler, cement, pharmaceuticals, textiles	Evaporites; VMS	
Non-metal ore minerals	Diamond	C	Cutting, jewelry	Kimberlites	
Non-metal ore minerals	Feldspar	Fsp	Ceramics, glassmaking, glazes	Orthoclase (KAlSi_{3}O_{8}) and albite (NaAlSi_{3}O_{8}) are ubiquitous throughout Earth's crust	

== See also ==
- Economic geology
- Extractive metallurgy (ore processing)
- Froth Flotation
- Mineral resource classification
- Ore genesis
- Petrology
- Polymetallic ore
