= Gloria mine =

Manganese mine in South Africa

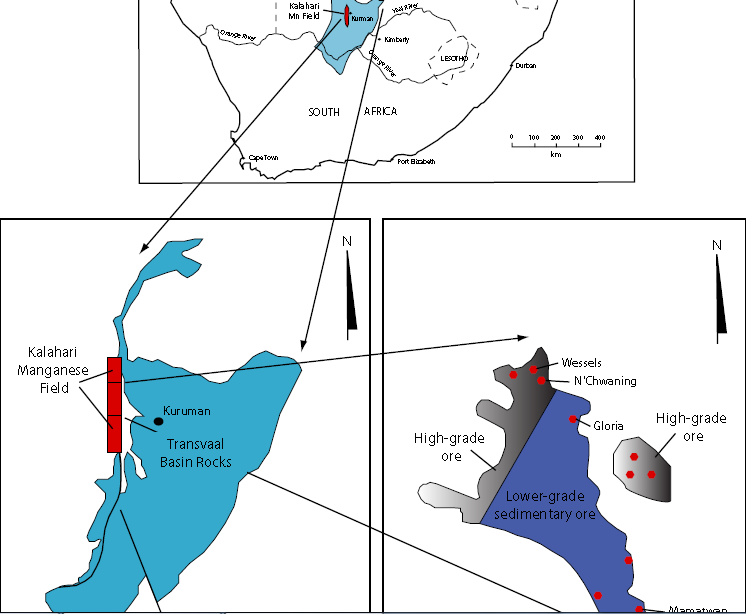
- Kalahari Manganese Field
- Location: South Africa
- Products: Manganese

The Gloria mine is a mine located in the north of South Africa. Gloria represents one of the largest manganese reserve in South Africa having estimated reserves of 156.2 million tonnes of manganese ore grading 33% manganese metal.

== See also ==
- Nchwaning mine
- Wessels mine
- Mamatwan mine
