= Pyrolusite =

Manganese dioxide mineral

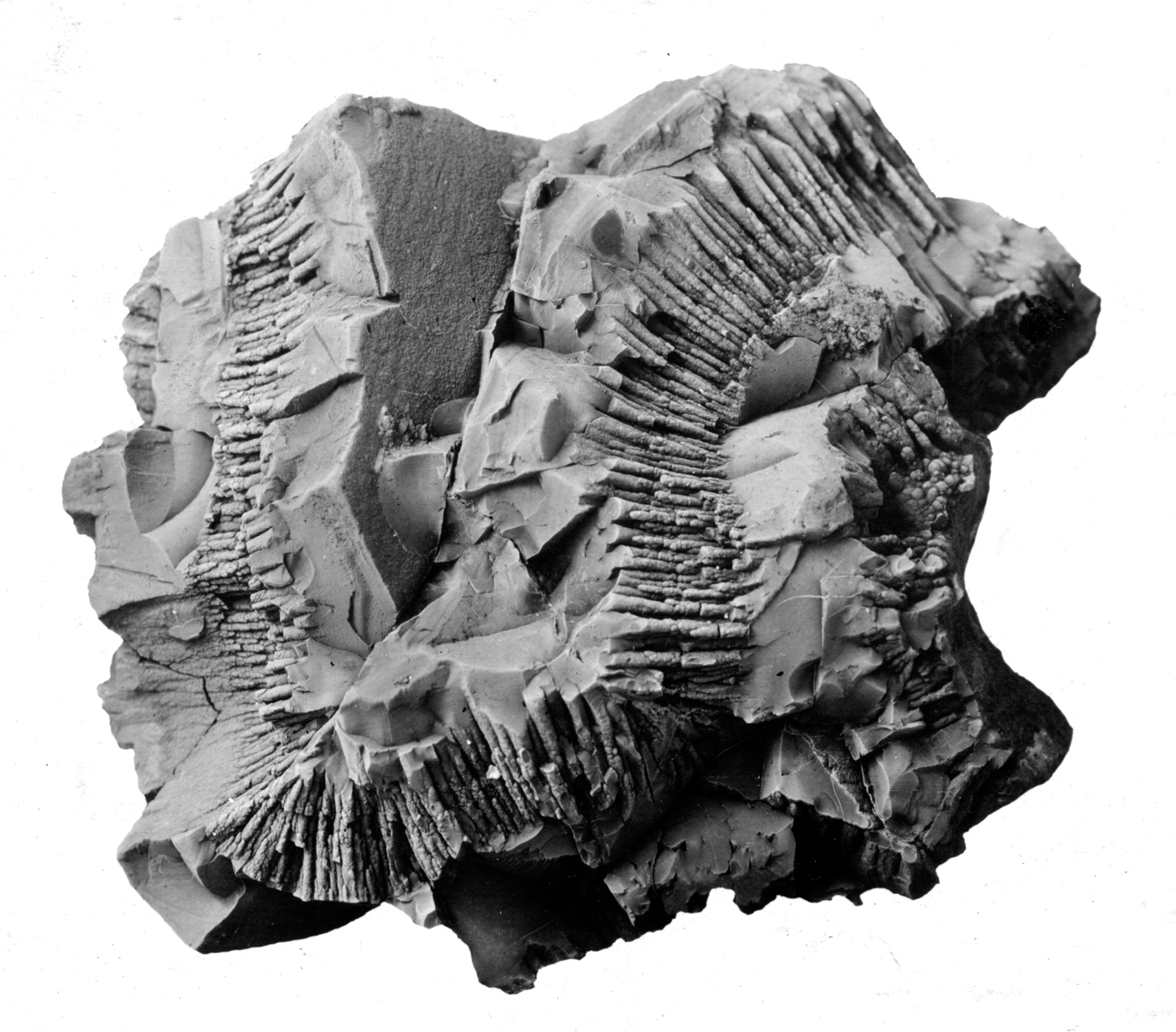

General
- Category: Oxide minerals
- Formula: MnO_{2}
- IMA symbol: Pyl
- Strunz classification: 4.DB.05
- Crystal system: Tetragonal
- Crystal class: Ditetragonal dipyramidal (4/mmm); H-M symbol: (4/m 2/m 2/m)
- Space group: P4_{2}/mnm

Identification
- Color: Darkish, black to lighter grey, sometimes bluish
- Crystal habit: Granular to massive: botryoidal. Crystals rare
- Twinning: {031}, {032} may be polysynthetic
- Cleavage: Perfect on {110}
- Fracture: Irregular/Uneven
- Tenacity: Brittle
- Mohs scale hardness: 6–6.5, 2 when massive
- Luster: Metallic, dull to earthy
- Streak: Black to bluish-black
- Specific gravity: 4.4–5.06
- Refractive index: Opaque

Major varieties
- Polianite: pseudomorphic after manganite

Pyrolusite is a mineral consisting essentially of manganese dioxide (MnO_{2}) and is important as an ore of manganese. It is a black, amorphous appearing mineral, often with a granular, fibrous, or columnar structure, sometimes forming reniform crusts. It has a metallic luster, a black or bluish-black streak, and readily soils the fingers. The specific gravity is about 4.8. Its name is from the Greek for fire and to wash, in reference to its use as a way to remove tints from glass.

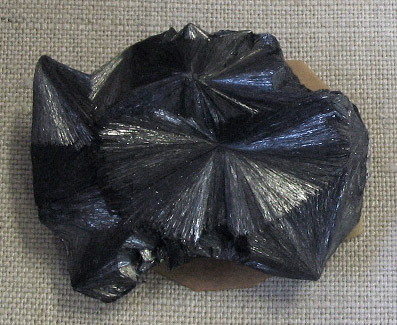
Acicular radiating pyrolusite

== Occurrence ==
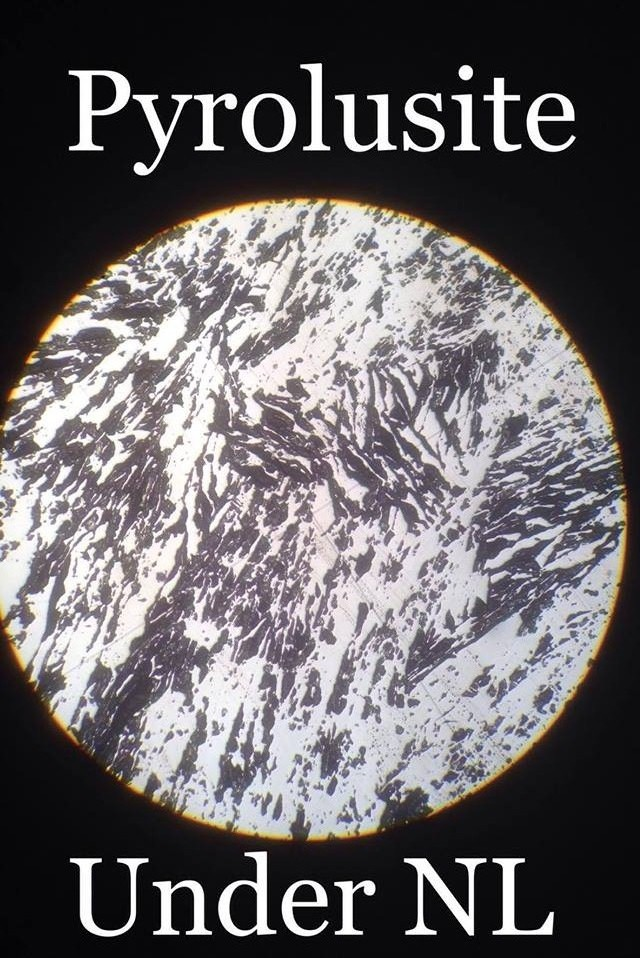
A microscopic image of Pyrolusite

Pyrolusite and romanèchite are among the most common manganese minerals. Pyrolusite occurs associated with manganite, hollandite, hausmannite, braunite, cryptomelane, chalcophanite, goethite, and hematite under oxidizing conditions in hydrothermal deposits. It also occurs in bogs and often results from alteration of manganite. it can also occur alongside rhodonite, which is generally pink.

== Use ==
The metal is obtained by reduction of the oxide with sodium, magnesium, aluminium, or by electrolysis. Pyrolusite is extensively used for the manufacture of spiegeleisen and ferromanganese and of various alloys such as manganese-bronze. As an oxidizing agent it is used in the preparation of chlorine; indeed, chlorine gas itself was first described by Karl Scheele in 1774 from the reaction products of pyrolusite and hydrochloric acid. Natural pyrolusite has been used in batteries, but high-quality batteries require synthetic products. Pyrolusite is also used to prepare disinfectants (permanganates) and for decolorizing glass. When mixed with molten glass it oxidizes the ferrous iron to ferric iron, and so discharges the green and brown tints (making it classically useful to glassmakers as a decolorizer). As a coloring material, it is used in calico printing and dyeing; for imparting violet, amber, and black colors to glass, pottery, and bricks; and in the manufacture of green and violet paints.

== Dendritic manganese oxides ==
Black, manganese oxides with a dendritic crystal habit often found on fracture or rock surfaces are often assumed to be pyrolusite although careful analyses of numerous examples of these dendrites has shown that none of them are, in fact, pyrolusite. Instead, they are other forms of manganese oxide.

== History ==
Some of the most famous early cave paintings in Europe were executed by means of manganese dioxide. Blocks of pyrolusite are found often at Neanderthal sites. It may have been kept as a pigment for cave paintings, but it has also been suggested that it was powdered and mixed with tinder fungus for lighting fires. Manganese dioxide, in the form of umber, was one of the earliest natural substances used by human ancestors. It was used as a pigment at least from the Middle Paleolithic. It may have been also used by the Neanderthals in fire-making.

The ancient Greeks had a term μάγνης or Μάγνης λίθος ("Magnes lithos") meaning stone of the area called Μαγνησία (Magnesia), referring to Magnesia in Thessaly or to areas in Asia Minor with that name. Two minerals are called μάγνης, namely lodestone and pyrolusite (manganese dioxide).(not to be confused with the current mineral called Lodestone, which does not contain Manganese. Lodestone is a naturally magnetized form of the iron mineral Magnetite. FeFe2O4) The term μαγνησία was used for manganese dioxide. In the sixteenth century it was called "manganesum". It also was called Alabandicus (from the Alabanda region of Asia Minor) and Braunstein. Eventually the name of the element manganese was derived from "manganesum", whereas "magnesia" came to mean the oxide of a different element, magnesium.

== See also ==
Other manganese oxides:

- Birnessite
- Psilomelane
