= Wessels mine =

Manganese mine in Northern Cape, South Africa

Coordinates: 27.2000°S 22.9667°E

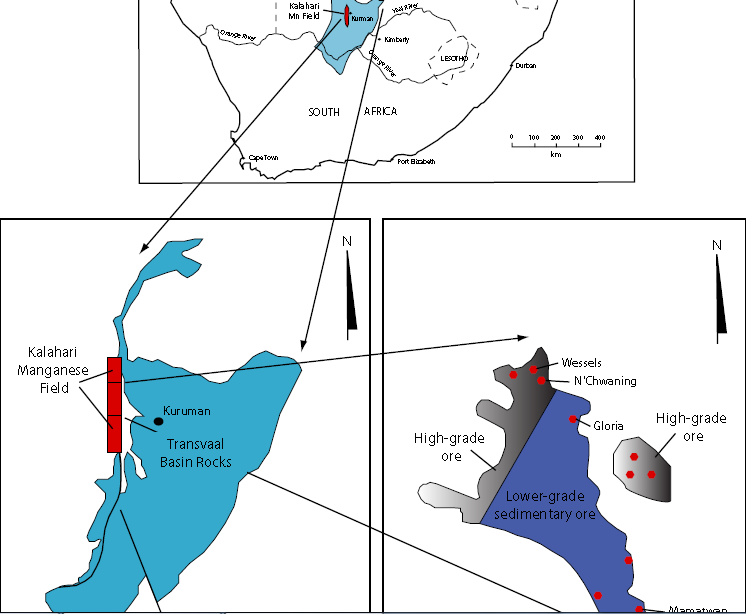
- Kalahari Manganese Field

- Location within South Africa
- Location: Northern Cape, South Africa
- Products: Manganese
- Company: Samancor Manganese (60% South32 and 40% Anglo American plc)

The Wessels mine is a mine located in the west of South Africa in Northern Cape. Wessels represents one of the largest manganese reserve in South Africa having estimated reserves of 198.8 million tonnes of manganese ore grading 55% manganese metal.

== See also ==
- Nchwaning mine
- Gloria mine
- Mamatwan mine
