= Hausmannite =

Mixed oxide mineral of manganese II and III: Mn3O4

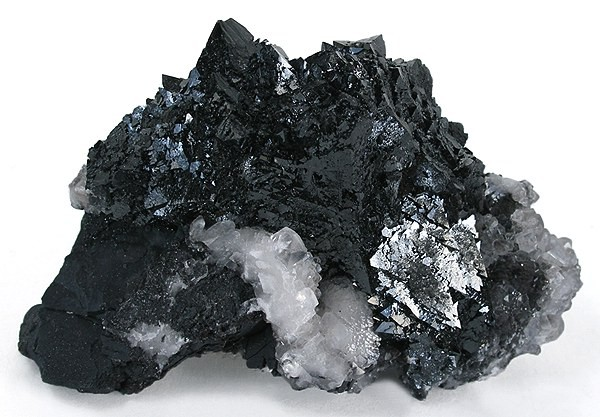

General
- Category: Oxide mineral
- Formula: Mn^{II}Mn^{III}_{2}O_{4}, MnO·Mn_{2}O_{3}, or Mn_{3}O_{4}
- IMA symbol: Hsm
- Strunz classification: 4.BB.10
- Crystal system: Tetragonal
- Crystal class: Ditetragonal dipyramidal (4/mmm); H-M symbol: (4/m 2/m 2/m)
- Space group: I4_{1}/amd
- Unit cell: a = 5.76 Å c = 9.46 Å; Z = 4

Identification
- Formula mass: 228.81 g/mol
- Color: Brownish black, grayish.
- Crystal habit: Massive – granular – common texture observed in granite and other igneous rock. pseudo octahedral – crystals show an octahedral outline.
- Twinning: Repeated twins on {112}
- Cleavage: [001] Perfect
- Fracture: Uneven – flat surfaces (not cleavage) fractured in an uneven pattern.
- Tenacity: Brittle
- Mohs scale hardness: 5.5
- Luster: Submetallic
- Streak: Dark reddish brown
- Diaphaneity: Opaque, transparent on thin edges
- Specific gravity: 4.7 – 4.84, average = 4.76
- Optical properties: Uniaxial (−)
- Refractive index: n_{ε} = 2.15, n_{ω} = 2.46
- Birefringence: δ = 0.31
- Other characteristics: Anisotropism: Distinct, bireflectance: weak; O = light gray; E = dark gray.

Hausmannite is a complex mixed oxide of manganese containing both di- and tri-valent manganese. Its chemical formula can be represented as Mn^{II}Mn^{III}_{2}O_{4}, or more simply noted as MnO·Mn_{2}O_{3}, or Mn_{3}O_{4}, as commonly done for magnetite (Fe_{3}O_{4}), the corresponding iron oxide. It belongs to the spinel group and forms tetragonal crystals. A brown to black metallic mineral, Hausmannite has a specific gravity of 5.5 and Mohs hardness a of 4.8.

The type locality is Oehrenstock (Öhrenstock), Ilmenau, Thuringian Forest, Thuringia, Germany, where it was first described in 1813. Locations include Batesville, Arkansas, US; Ilfeld, Germany; Långban, Sweden; and the Ural Mountains, Russia. High quality samples have been found in South Africa and Namibia, where it is associated with other manganese oxides, pyrolusite and psilomelane and the iron-manganese mineral bixbyite. Hausmannite was named by Wilhelm Haidinger in 1827, in honour of Johann Friedrich Ludwig Hausmann (1782–1859), Professor of Mineralogy, University of Göttingen.

== Image gallery ==
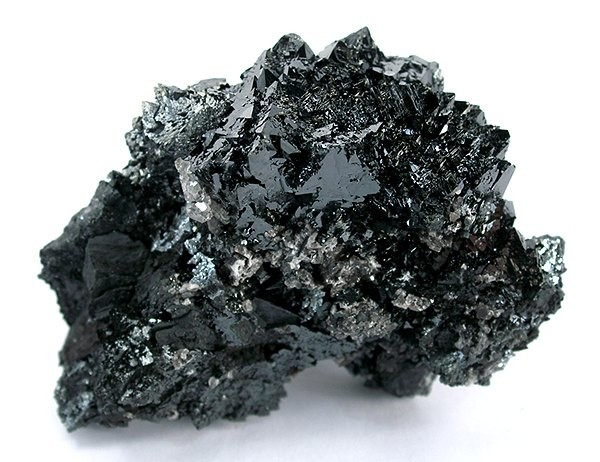
Hausmannite from Wessels mine, Kalahari manganese fields, Northern Cape Province, South Africa

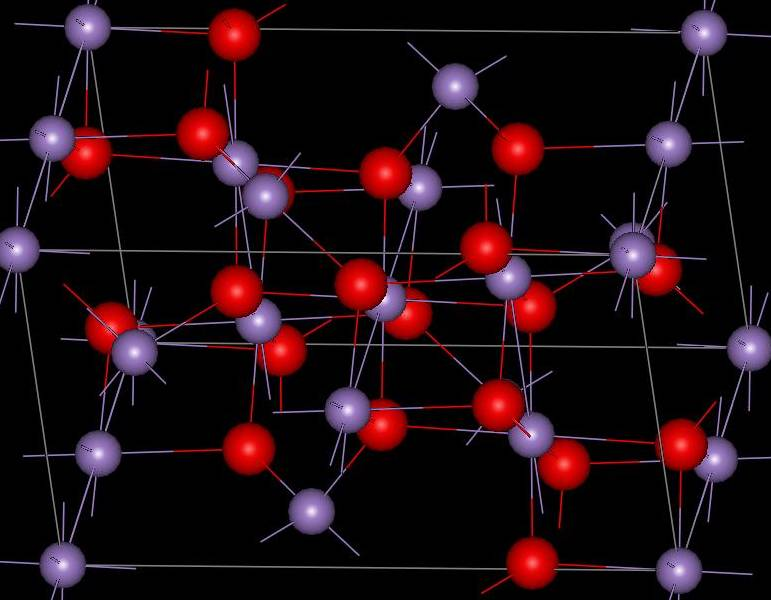
Crystal structure of hausmannite

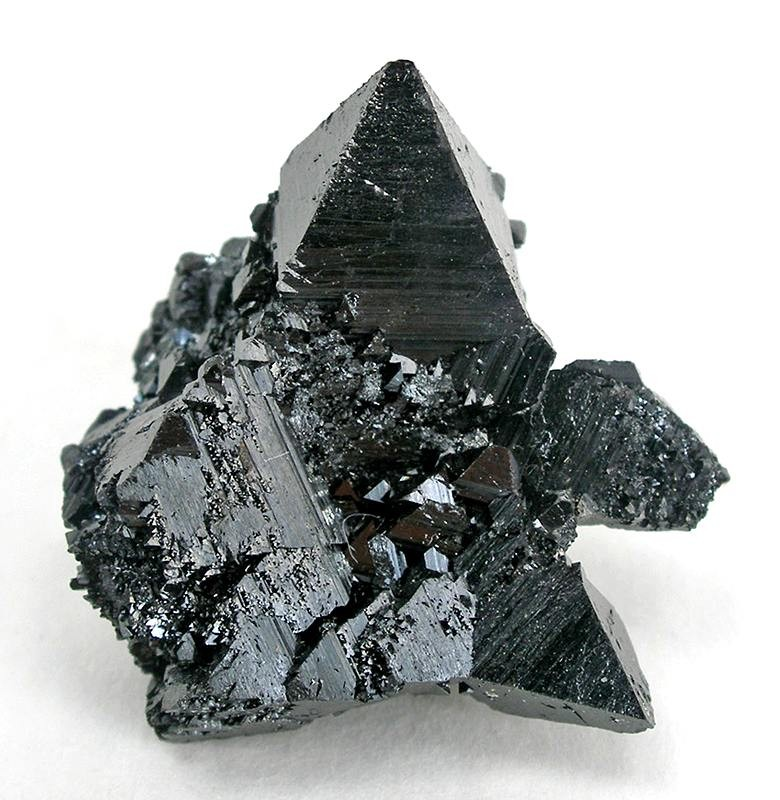
Cluster from Wessels mine

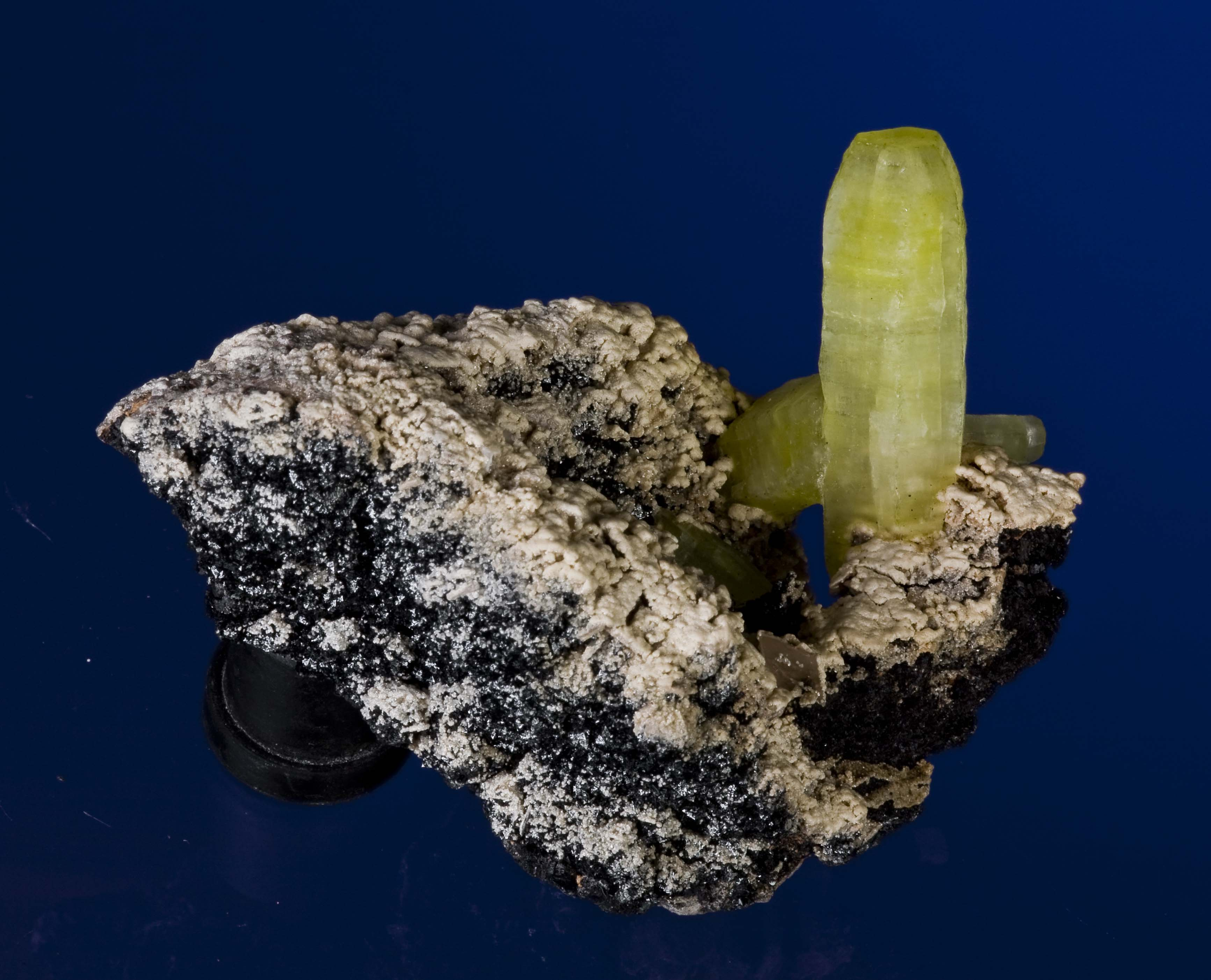
Ettringite crystal on a matrix of hausmannite and hematite, coated by oyelite
