= Braunite =

Nesosilicate mineral of manganese

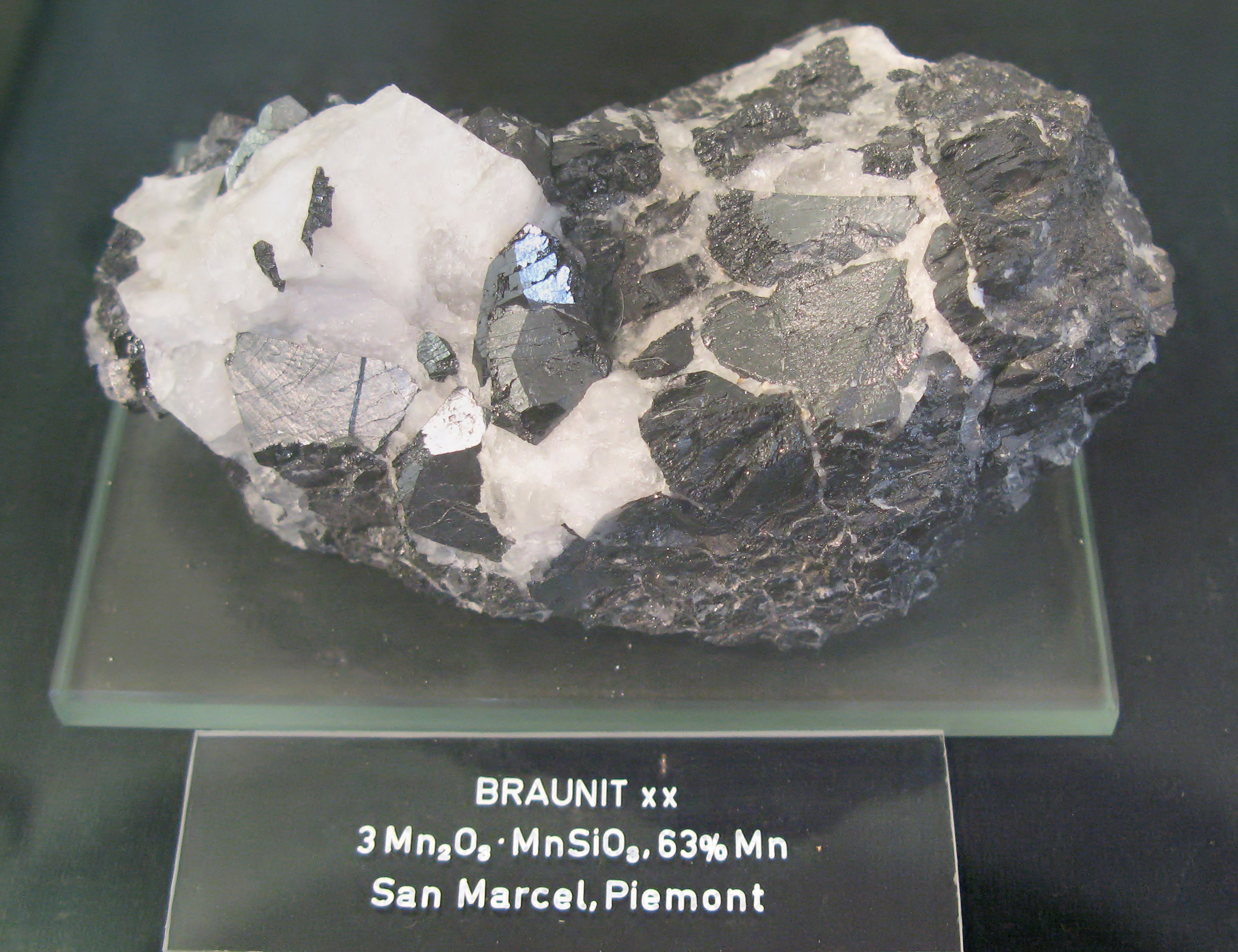
- Braunite, from San Marcel, Piemonte, Italy

General
- Category: Nesosilicates
- Formula: Mn^{2+}Mn^{3+}_{6}[O_{8}|SiO_{4}]
- IMA symbol: Bnt
- Strunz classification: 9.AG.05
- Dana classification: 7.5.1.3
- Crystal system: Tetragonal
- Crystal class: Ditetragonal dipyramidal (4/mmm); H-M symbol: (4/m 2/m 2/m)
- Space group: I4_{1}/acd

Identification
- Color: brownish black, steel-grey
- Cleavage: {112} perfect
- Mohs scale hardness: 6–6 1/2
- Luster: sub-metallic
- Streak: black
- Diaphaneity: opaque
- Specific gravity: 4.72 – 4.83

Braunite is a silicate mineral containing both di- and tri-valent manganese with the chemical formula: Mn^{2+}Mn^{3+}_{6}[O_{8}|SiO_{4}]. Common impurities include iron, calcium, boron, barium, titanium, aluminium, and magnesium.

Braunite forms grey/black tetragonal crystals and has a Mohs hardness of 6 – 6.5.

It was named after the Wilhelm von Braun (1790–1872) of Gotha, Thuringia, Germany.

A calcium iron bearing variant, named braunite II (formula: Ca(Mn^{3+},Fe^{3+})_{14}SiO_{24}), was discovered and described in 1967 from Kalahari, Cape Province, South Africa.
