= Whisker (disambiguation) =

A whisker is a type of mammalian hair.

Whisker or Whiskers may also refer to:

== Arts and entertainment ==
- Whiskers, the main family group in the British television show Meerkat Manor
- Whiskers, a fictional winged cat in Michael Moorcock's Multiverse
- Whiskers, a fictional villain in The Tale of Samuel Whiskers or The Roly-Poly Pudding by Beatrix Potter
- Captain Whiskers, villain of the video game Sonic Rush Adventure
- Mr. Whiskers, a character in the American animated television series Brandy & Mr. Whiskers

== People ==
- Alexander Whisker (1819–1907), New Zealand soldier and diarist
- Andrew Mowatt Whisker (1907–1992), Canadian lumberman and politician

== Science and technology ==
- Whisker (metallurgy), a strong hair-shaped protrusion on a metal's surface
- Monocrystalline whisker, a type of fiber consisting of a single, defect-free crystal

== Other uses ==
- Whisker (horse) (1812–1832), a thoroughbred racehorse and winner of the 1815 Epsom Derby
- Whisker, in statistics an element of a box plot
- Whisker, a project of the Cult of the Dead Cow which checked for security vulnerabilities in web servers
- "Whiskers", slang for human facial hair on the chin or cheeks
- Lake Whisker, a lake of Wisconsin

== See also ==
- Whiskas, a brand of cat food
- Whiskering, an operation in category theory between a functor and a natural transformation
