= George Petersen =

George Petersen may refer to:

- George Petersen (biochemist) (1933–2021), New Zealand biochemist
- George Petersen (historian) (1900–1978), New Zealand lawyer, consul, local politician and historian
- George Petersen (politician) (1921–2000), Australian politician and member of the New South Wales Legislative Assembly

== See also ==
- George Peterson (disambiguation)
