= Dictionary of New Zealand Biography =

Biography collection from 1990 to the present

- Author: W. H. Oliver (ed.) 1983–1990; Claudia Orange (ed.) 1990–2003; 1,239 individual contributors
- Language: English, Māori
- Subject: New Zealand biography
- Genre: Encyclopedia
- Publisher: Various
- Publication date: 1990–2000
- Publication place: New Zealand
- Media type: 5 volumes; also available on-line

The Dictionary of New Zealand Biography (DNZB) is an encyclopedia or biographical dictionary containing biographies of over 3,000 deceased New Zealanders. It was first published as a series of print volumes from 1990 to 2000, went online in 2002, and is now a part of Te Ara: The Encyclopedia of New Zealand. The dictionary superseded An Encyclopaedia of New Zealand of 1966, which had 900 biographies. The dictionary is managed by the Ministry for Culture and Heritage of the New Zealand Government. An earlier work of the same name in two volumes containing 2,250 entries, published in 1940 by Guy Scholefield with government assistance, is unrelated.

== Overview ==
Work on the current version of the DNZB was started in 1983 under the editorship of W. H. Oliver. The first volume covered the period 1769–1869 and went on sale on 18 June 1990. The four subsequent volumes were all edited by Claudia Orange, and were published in 1993 (1879–1900), 1996 (1901–1920), 1998 (1920–1940), and 2000 (1941–1960).

These later volumes made a conscious effort to move towards a more representative view of New Zealand with a greater number of female and Māori entries. Women who had done well in male-dominated fields (Sybil Audrey Marie Lupp, Amy Johnston, Mary Jane Innes, Alice Woodward Horsley, Nora Mary Crawford, etc.) were included, as were Māori, a range of ordinary people (Joseph Zillwood, etc.) and criminals (Edward Raymond Horton, Jessie Finnie, etc.). Many of these people were included because detailed accounts of their lives were readily available, in archives, academic studies and official histories. Others were prolific diarists (Catherine Fulton, Sarah Louise Mathew, Alexander Whisker, James Cox, etc.).

Helen Clark as Minister of Arts, Culture and Heritage launched the online version of the DNZB on 19 February 2002. The online version was first promoted by Judith Tizard, a graduate in history from the University of Auckland, which was supported by Clark, who had also graduated in history from the same university, and endorsed by Michael Cullen, who had been a history lecturer at the University of Otago.

The dictionary was integrated into Te Ara: The Encyclopedia of New Zealand in December 2010. In 2017 the Ministry for Culture and Heritage announced a 'new phase' in the life of the DNZB, with the addition of an essay about the Polynesian navigator Tupaia; this was followed in 2018 by 25 new essays to mark the 125th anniversary of women's suffrage in New Zealand. Subsequent rounds will illuminate the lives of significant and representative people from a cross-section of New Zealand society, with a focus on the decades after 1960.

== Representative entries ==
A number of entries were added to make the dictionary more representative of population covered, boosting the numbers of women, Māori, and other minority groups. A number of these are not based on secondary sources, as encyclopedias traditionally are, but instead on primary sources, because no secondary sources exist for these individuals.

=== Margaret Fraser ===
Fraser (later Johnston; 11 December 1866 – 31 August 1951) was a New Zealand domestic servant and letter-writer. Born in Scotland, she emigrated with her brother in 1887, following two brothers who had gone to New Zealand earlier that decade. She was hoping for the remainder of her family to come out but when that did not happen, she started financially supporting them by sending money to Scotland. After many years as a domestic servant, she married in 1899 and had a farm with her husband, bringing up four children. They retired to Rotorua and after her husband's death, she lived with her daughter and grandchildren for another decade.

=== Jessie Finnie ===
Finnie (c.1822–?) was a prostitute. She was born in Scotland in circa 1822.

=== Nielsine Paget ===
Nielsine Paget (21 July 1858 – 13 July 1932) was a homemaker and community worker in southern Hawke's Bay.

=== Barbara Weldon ===
Weldon (1829–1882) was a prostitute and character. She was born in County Limerick, Ireland in about 1829.

== Accolades ==
- In 1991, the first print volume won the 1991 Goodman Fielder Wattie Book Awards.
- In 2002, Yahoo users in New Zealand and Australia voted the Dictionary of New Zealand Biography website "site of the year".

== Bibliography ==
- Scholefield, Guy, ed. (1940). A Dictionary of New Zealand Biography : A–L (PDF). Vol. I. Wellington: Department of Internal Affairs.
- Scholefield, Guy, ed. (1940). A Dictionary of New Zealand Biography : M–Addenda (PDF). Vol. II. Wellington: Department of Internal Affairs.
- Oliver, W. H., ed. (1990). The Dictionary of New Zealand Biography. Vol. I. Wellington: Allen & Unwin. ISBN 004641052X.
- Orange, Claudia, ed. (1993). The Dictionary of New Zealand Biography. Vol. II. Wellington: Allen & Unwin. ISBN 0908912498.
- Orange, Claudia, ed. (1996). The Dictionary of New Zealand Biography. Vol. III. Wellington: Allen & Unwin. ISBN 1869402006.
- Orange, Claudia, ed. (1998). The Dictionary of New Zealand Biography. Vol. IV. Wellington: Bridget Williams Books. ISBN 1869402030.
- Orange, Claudia, ed. (2000). The Dictionary of New Zealand Biography. Vol. V. Auckland: Auckland University Press. ISBN 1869402243.
