= Dictionary of New Zealand Biography (1940) =

- Author: Guy Scholefield
- Language: English,
- Subject: New Zealand biography
- Genre: Encyclopaedia
- Publication date: 1940
- Publication place: New Zealand
- Media type: 2 volumes;

The Dictionary of New Zealand Biography was published in two volumes in 1940 by Guy Scholefield. Scholefield had worked on the publication for over 30 years and received government assistance when the biography was included in the list of books to be published for the New Zealand centenary.

Scholefield was a journalist, historian, and librarian. He first had the idea of compiling a dictionary of New Zealand biographies in 1907. Together with Emil Schwabe, he edited the 1908 edition of Who's Who in New Zealand and the Western Pacific. He was the primary editor of the two 1940 volumes of the Dictionary of New Zealand Biography and wrote about 95% of the biographies. For the two volumes, he received an honorarium from the government of £300. The 1940 edition was part of a series a state-funded publications celebrating the country's centenary. Scholefield's work received glowing reviews in the newspapers, with the sentiment of Kerehi, the reviewer for The New Zealand Herald, echoed by most newspapers:

Dr. G. H. Scholefield's Dictionary of New Zealand Biography stands out as one of the most permanently valuable works of reference yet produced in the Dominion. It is an excellent legacy from the Centennial year.

— Kerehi, The New Zealand Herald

The work was modelled on the British Dictionary of National Biography. The New Zealand Herald estimated that 2,250 biographies are contained in the two volumes. Of those New Zealanders who reached the age of 24, the Auckland Star estimates that 1 in 2500 people received an entry in Scholefield's biography.

The agreement with Scholefield allowed for further editions and corrigenda at perhaps ten-yearly intervals. By 1955, Scholefield had enough material for a third volume covering the 1941–1951 period, but this did not go ahead. Instead, the government approved in 1959 the production of An Encyclopaedia of New Zealand by the then-parliamentary librarian, Alexander Hare McLintock. Government officials regarded that there was thus no need for a third volume and whilst they allowed for Scholefield to privately issue a supplement, they did not allow him to have the original volumes reprinted. By then, the original print run of 2,000 copies had sold out. The set's retail price was £2 10s.

The 1940 volumes have been scanned with OCR technology, resulting in searchable PDFs, and put online. The 1940 biography is unrelated to the current work of the same name.
