= Dendrite (metal) =

Tree-like structure of crystals

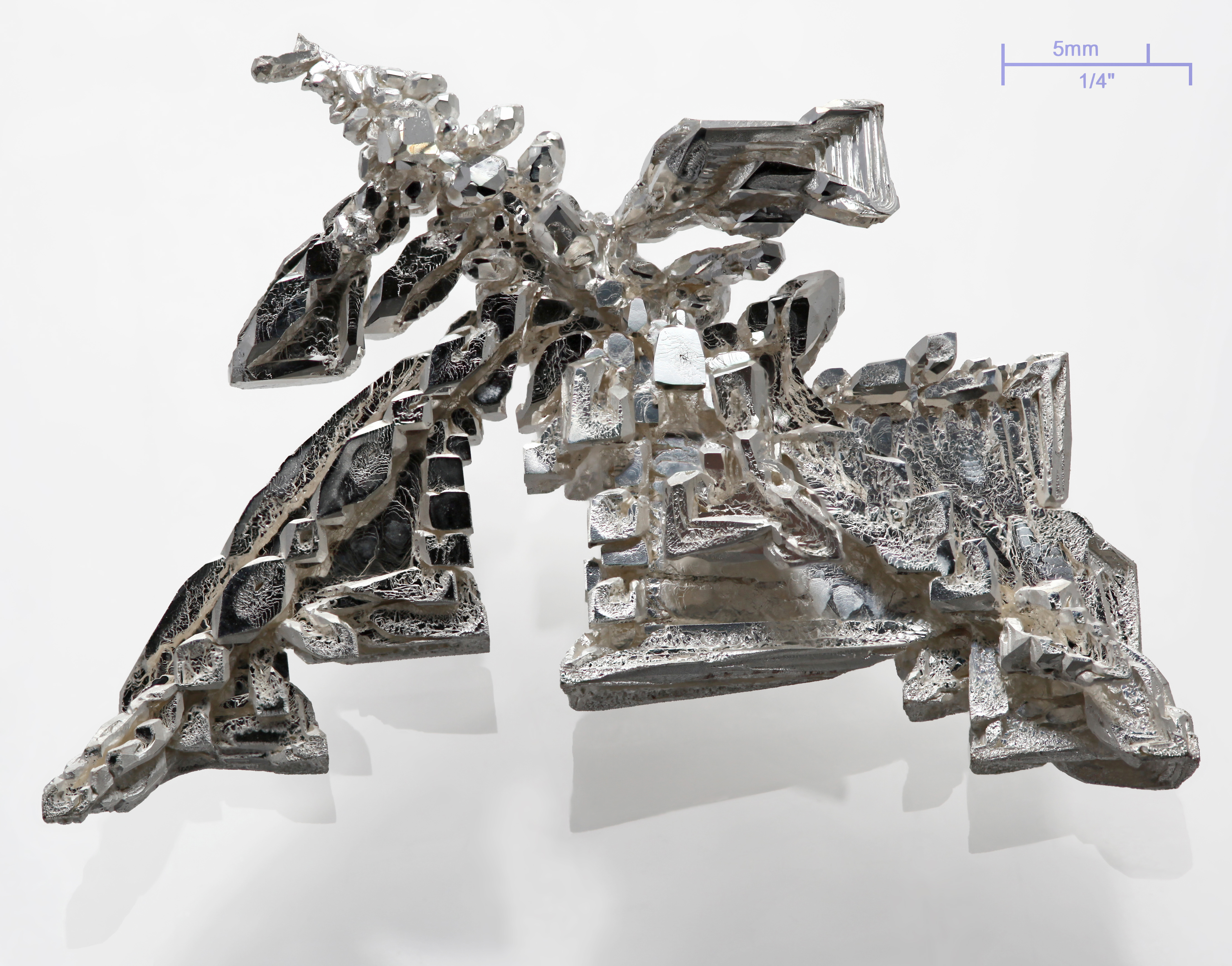
A silver crystal, electrolytically refined with visible dendritic structures

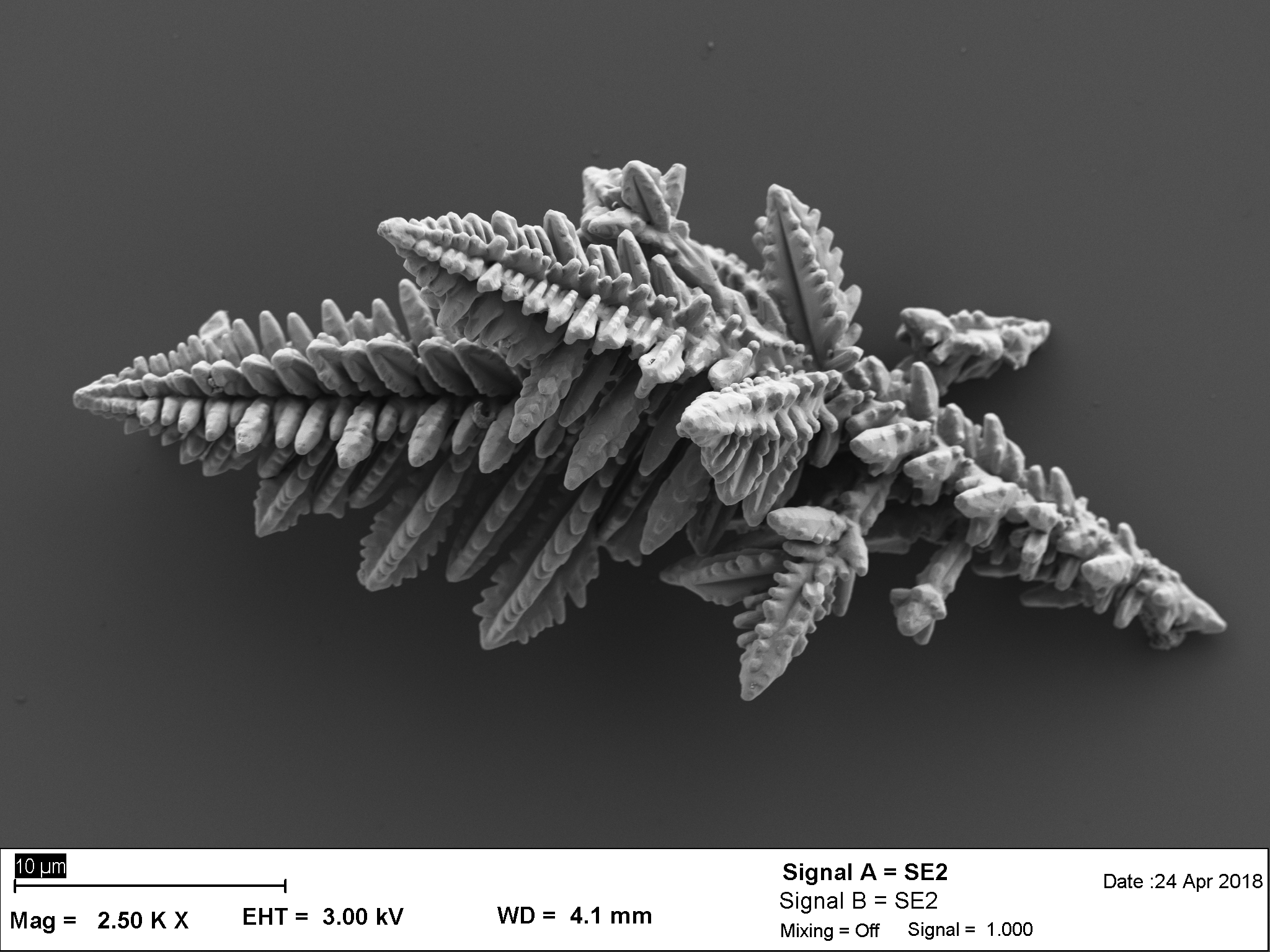
A pure copper crystal with dendritic structure, electrolytic made.

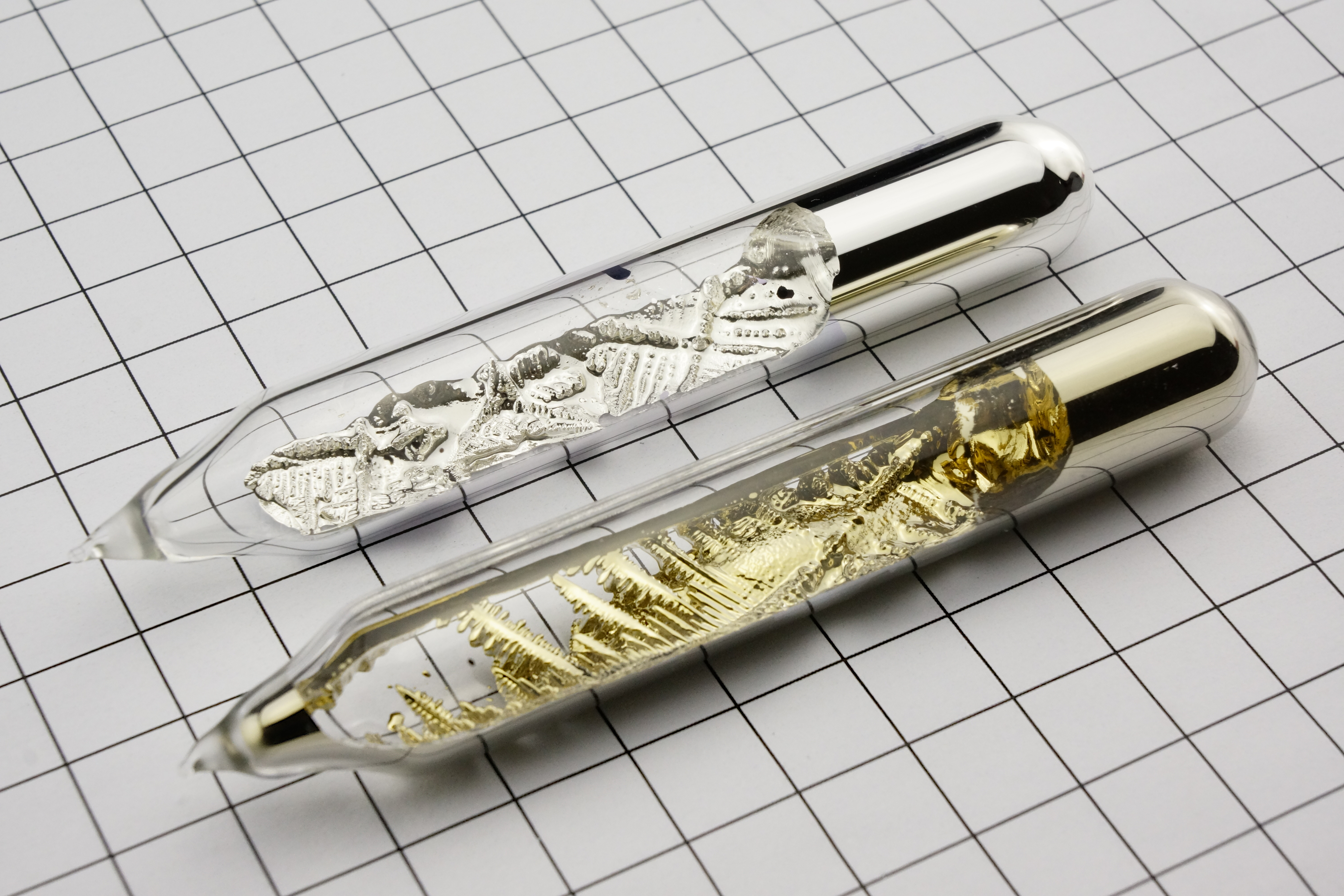
Dendritic crystallization after melting inside sealed ampules of rubidium and caesium metal

A dendrite in metallurgy is a characteristic tree-like structure of crystals growing as molten metal solidifies, the shape produced by faster growth along energetically favourable crystallographic directions. This dendritic growth has large consequences in regard to material properties.

== Formation ==
Dendrites form in unary (one-component) systems as well as multi-component systems. The requirement is that the liquid (the molten material) be undercooled, aka supercooled, below the freezing point of the solid. Initially, a spherical solid nucleus grows in the undercooled melt. As the sphere grows, the spherical morphology becomes unstable and its shape becomes perturbed. The solid shape begins to express the preferred growth directions of the crystal. This growth direction may be due to anisotropy in the surface energy of the solid–liquid interface, or to the ease of attachment of atoms to the interface on different crystallographic planes, or both (for an example of the latter, see hopper crystal). In metallic systems, interface attachment kinetics is usually negligible (for non-negligible cases, see dendrite (crystal)). The solid then attempts to minimize the area of those surfaces with the highest surface energy. The dendrite thus exhibits a sharper and sharper tip as it grows. If the anisotropy is large enough, the dendrite may present a faceted morphology. The microstructural length scale is determined by the interplay or balance between the surface energy and the temperature gradient (which drives the heat/solute diffusion) in the liquid at the interface.

As solidification proceeds, an increasing number of atoms lose their kinetic energy, making the process exothermic. For a pure material, latent heat is released at the solid–liquid interface so that the temperature remains constant until the melt has completely solidified. The growth rate of the resultant crystalline substance will depend on how fast this latent heat can be conducted away. A dendrite growing in an undercooled melt can be approximated as a parabolic needle-like crystal that grows in a shape-preserving manner at constant velocity. Nucleation and growth determine the grain size in equiaxed solidification while the competition between adjacent dendrites decides the primary spacing in columnar growth. Generally, if the melt is cooled slowly, nucleation of new crystals will be less than at large undercooling. The dendritic growth will result in dendrites of a large size. Conversely, a rapid cooling cycle with a large undercooling will increase the number of nuclei and thus reduce the size of the resulting dendrites (and often lead to small grains).

Smaller dendrites generally lead to higher ductility of the product. One application where dendritic growth and resulting material properties can be seen is the process of welding. The dendrites are also common in cast products, where they may become visible by etching of a polished specimen.

As dendrites develop further into the liquid metal, they get hotter because they continue to extract heat. If they get too hot, they will remelt. This remelting of the dendrites is called recalescence. Dendrites usually form under non-equilibrium conditions.

== Computational modeling ==
Phase-field simulation of dendritic solidification of a pure material using the model developed by Kobayashi with six-fold anisotropy. The white region represents solid $(\phi=1)$ and the blue region represents liquid $(\phi=0)$.

The first computational model of dendritic solidification was published by Kobayashi, who used a phase-field model to solve two coupled partial differential equations describing the evolution of the phase-field, $\phi$ (with $\phi=0$ in the liquid phase and $\phi=1$ in the solid phase), and the temperature field, $T$, for a pure material in two dimensions:

$$\tau \frac{\partial \phi}{\partial t} = -\frac{\partial}{\partial x} \left( \epsilon \frac{\partial \epsilon}{\partial \theta} \frac{\partial \phi}{\partial y} \right) + \frac{\partial}{\partial y} \left( \epsilon \frac{\partial \epsilon}{\partial \theta} \frac{\partial \phi}{\partial x} \right) + \nabla \cdot \left( \epsilon^2 \nabla \phi \right) + \phi (1- \phi) \left( \phi - \frac{1}{2} + m +a\chi \right)$$

which is an Allen-Cahn equation with an anisotropic gradient energy coefficient:

$$\epsilon(\theta) = \bar{\epsilon} \left[ 1 + \delta \cos (j\theta) \right]$$

where $\bar{\epsilon}$ is an average value of $\epsilon$, $\theta$ is the angle between the interface normal and the x-axis, and $\delta$ and $j$ are constants representing the strength and mode of anisotropy, respectively.

The parameter $m$ describes the thermodynamic driving force for solidification, which Kobayashi defines for a supercooled melt as:

$$m(T) = \frac{\alpha}{\pi} \tan^{-1} \left[ \gamma (T_e-T) \right]$$

where $\alpha$ is a constant between 0 and 1, $\gamma$ is a positive constant, and $T_e$ is the dimensionless equilibrium temperature. The temperature has been non-dimensionalized such that the equilibrium temperature is $T_e=1$ and the initial temperature of the undercooled melt is $T=0$.

The evolution equation for the temperature field is given by

$$\frac{\partial T}{\partial t} = \nabla^2 T + K \frac{\partial \phi}{\partial t}$$

and is simply the heat equation with a source term due to the evolution of latent heat upon solidification, where $K$ is a constant representing the latent heat normalized by the strength of the cooling.

When this system is numerically evolved, random noise representing thermal fluctuations is introduced to the interface via the $a\chi$ term, where $a$ is the magnitude of the noise and $\chi$ is a random number distributed uniformly on $[-0.5, 0.5]$.

== Application ==
An application of dendritic growth in directional solidification is gas turbine engine blades which are used at high temperatures and must handle high stresses along the major axes. At high temperatures, grain boundaries are weaker than grains. In order to minimize the effect on properties, grain boundaries are aligned parallel to the dendrites. The first alloy used in this application was a nickel-based alloy (MAR M-200) with 12.5% tungsten, which accumulated in the dendrites during solidification. This resulted in blades with high strength and creep resistance extending along the length of the casting, giving improved properties compared to the traditionally-cast equivalent.

== See also ==
- Diana's Tree
- Whisker (metallurgy)
