= Who's Who in New Zealand =

New Zealand biographical dictionary

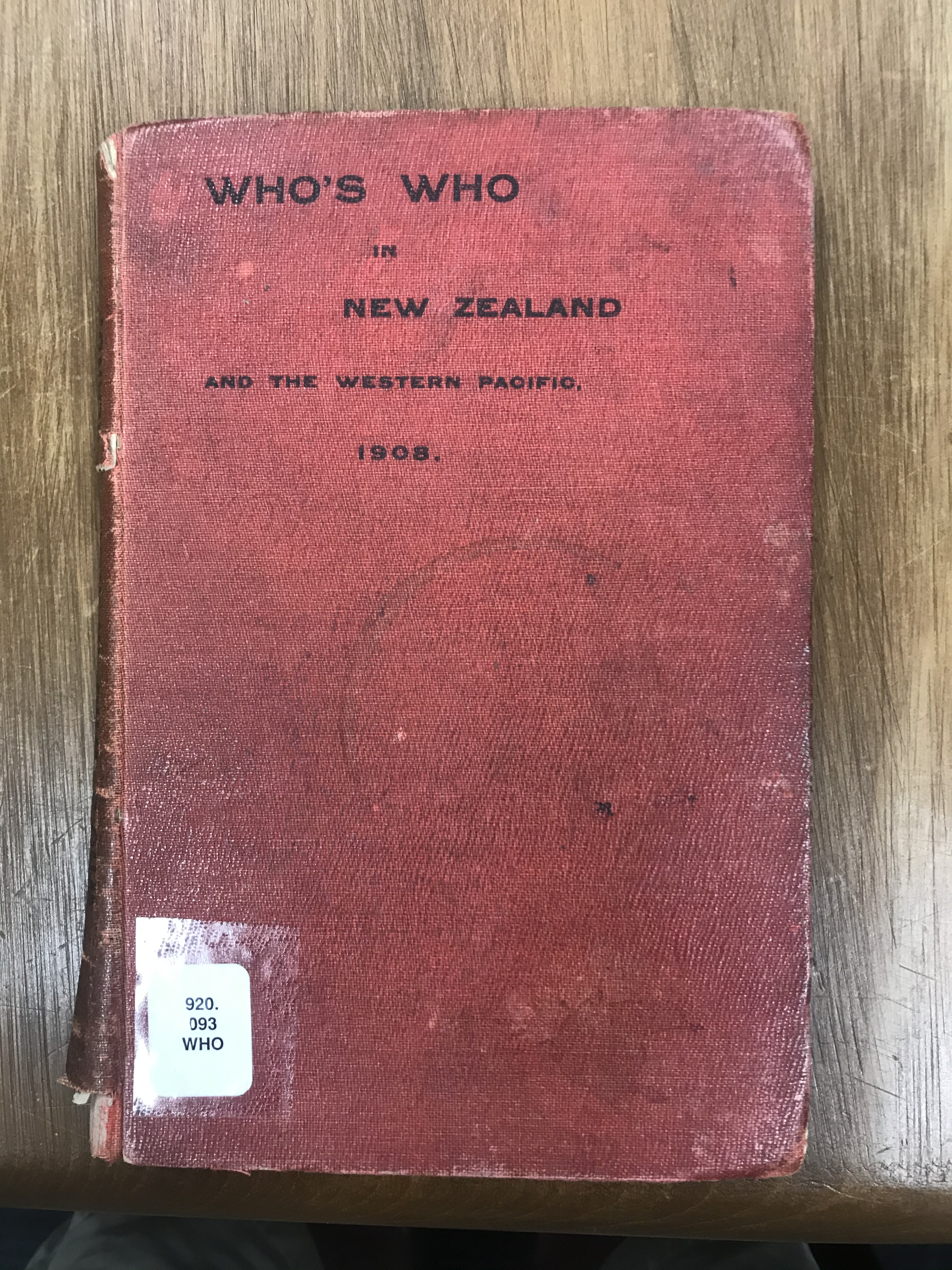
Book cover of the first edition from 1908

The Who's Who in New Zealand, originally called the Who's Who in New Zealand and the Western Pacific, is a collection of biographies that was first published in 1908, and the latest version—the 12th edition—is from 1991.

== History ==
The first edition was edited by the journalist and historian Guy Scholefield in association with Emil Schwabe. This was the first of a series of publications containing biographies compiled and edited by Scholefield, and it formed the basis for his later book Dictionary of New Zealand Biography, published in two volumes in 1940.

The Who's Who contained, according to Scholefield, those who had done "some definite service over and above what the individual was paid to do". There was no attempt made by Scholefield to make the Who's Who representative of New Zealand society. Scholefield edited the first five editions of this book. Frank Simpson edited the sixth edition. The next four editions were edited by George Petersen. Two further editions were published in 1978 and 1991, bringing the total number of editions to 12, with Jim Traue the editor in 1978 and Max Lambert the editor in 1991.

From the third edition, the books contain an obituary section, listing those who were included in the previous section but have since died, plus those whose inclusion was intended but who died prior to publication of the next issue.

The 12th and final edition of Who's Who in New Zealand was published in 1991. When Alister Taylor began working on his own version of the book, he was taken to court by Reed Publishing, which held the rights to the publication. They settled out of court and Taylor published the first volume of New Zealand Who's Who Aotearoa in 1992.

== Bibliography ==
- Scholefield, Guy; Schwabe, Emil, eds. (1908). Who's Who in New Zealand and the Western Pacific (1st ed.). Wellington: Gordon & Gotch.
- Scholefield, Guy (1924). Who's Who in New Zealand and the Western Pacific, 1925 (2nd ed.). Masterton.
- Scholefield, Guy (1932). Who's Who in New Zealand and the Western Pacific, 1932 (3rd ed.). Wellington: The Rangatira Press.
- Scholefield, Guy (1941). Who's Who in New Zealand and the Western Pacific, 1941 (4th ed.). Masterton.
- Scholefield, Guy (1951). Who's Who in New Zealand, 1951 (5th ed.). Wellington: A.H. & A.W. Reed.
- Simpson, Frank Alexander (1956). Who's Who in New Zealand, 1956 (6th ed.). Wellington: A.H. & A.W. Reed.
- Petersen, George Conrad (1961). Who's Who in New Zealand, 1961 (7th ed.). Wellington: A.H. & A.W. Reed.
- Petersen, George Conrad (1964). Who's Who in New Zealand, 1964 (8th ed.). Wellington: A.H. & A.W. Reed.
- Petersen, George Conrad (1968). Who's Who in New Zealand, 1968 (9th ed.). Wellington: A.H. & A.W. Reed.
- Petersen, George Conrad (1971). Who's Who in New Zealand, 1971 (10th ed.). Wellington: A.H. & A.W. Reed.
- Traue, James Edward, ed. (1978). Who's Who in New Zealand, 1978 (11th ed.). Wellington: Reed Publishing.
- Lambert, Max (1991). Who's Who in New Zealand, 1991 (12th ed.). Auckland: Octopus. ISBN 9780790001302.
