= Diana Hill (scientist) =

New Zealand biochemist (1943–2024)

Diana Hill CNZM FRSNZ
- Born: Diana Florence Hill; 29 March 1943; Upper Hutt, New Zealand
- Died: 9 July 2024 (aged 81); Whangārei, New Zealand
- Education: University of Otago
- Awards: New Zealand Suffrage Centennial Medal; Fellow of the Royal Society Te Apārangi
- Scientific career
- Fields: Biochemistry; Genetics
- Workplaces: University of Otago
- Thesis: Studies of the Structure and Function of the DNA of the Filamentous Bacteriophages (1980)
- Doctoral advisor: George Petersen

Diana Florence Hill CNZM FRSNZ (29 March 1943 – 9 July 2024) was a New Zealand biochemist and geneticist. She was an academic and full professor at the University of Otago, specialising in molecular genetics. Her team's work on the genetics of animal production won a Silver Medal from the Royal Society Te Apārangi in 1996 and she was elected a Fellow in 1997.

== Early life and education ==
Hill was born on 29 March 1943 at the Braeburn maternity hospital in Upper Hutt, to Norman Harold and Weva Marguerite Hill (née Bracegirdle). She initially trained as a nurse and was awarded a Florence Nightingale scholarship for further study.

Hill then completed a PhD titled Studies of the Structure and Function of the DNA of the Filamentous Bacteriophages in 1980 through the Department of Biochemistry at the University of Otago, supervised by Professor George Petersen. She followed this with postdoctoral research at Cambridge, UK, where she worked with Frederick Sanger and John Walker at the Laboratory of Molecular Biology.

== Career ==
Hill worked on techniques for sequencing of DNA and proteins, before becoming involved in animal breeding through the Invermay Agricultural Centre in Mosgiel. She recognised that the elite research flocks held at the centre offered the opportunity to explore the genetics of traits that are important for animal production. Though it was generally held that such traits were quantitative, she and her team developed methods to identifify single genes responsible for some.

This work led to New Zealand's first major agribiotechnological project, Otago and AgResearch's joint Molecular Biology Unit, established in 1989. The unit created gene maps for sheep and deer as well as developing sheep as models for human diseases. The Royal Society awarded the work a Silver Medal for team excellence in 1996.

Hill established Global Technologies (NZ) Ltd in 1999, a joint venture with Silver Fern Farms and was awarded a personal chair at Otago. From 1999 to 2001, she chaired the Marsden Fund committee, then its second council, succeeding Ian Axford.

== Death ==
Hill died in Whangārei on 9 July 2024, at the age of 81.

== Honours and awards ==
Hill received a New Zealand Suffrage Centennial Medal in 1993. She was elected a Fellow of the Royal Society of New Zealand in 1997. She was appointed a Companion of the New Zealand Order of Merit (CNZM), for services to science, in the 2002 Queen's Birthday and Golden Jubilee Honours.

== Selected work ==
- Thomas E. Broad; Diana F. Hill; Jillian F. Maddox; Grant W. Montgomery; Frank W. Nicholas (1 January 1998). "The Sheep Gene Map". ILAR Journal. 39 (2–3): 160–170. doi:10.1093/ilar.39.2-3.160. ISSN 1084-2020. PMID 11528074. Wikidata Q74440494.
- D. F. Hill; G. B. Petersen (1 October 1982). "Nucleotide sequence of bacteriophage f1 DNA". Journal of Virology. 44 (1): 32–46. doi:10.1128/jvi.44.1.32-46.1982. ISSN 0022-538X. PMC 256238. PMID 6292494. Wikidata Q40142434.
- Sanger F; Coulson AR; Hong GF; Hill DF; Petersen GB (1 December 1982). "Nucleotide sequence of bacteriophage lambda DNA". Journal of Molecular Biology. 162 (4): 729–773. doi:10.1016/0022-2836(82)90546-0. ISSN 0022-2836. PMID 6221115. Wikidata Q34055022.
