= Claudia Orange =

New Zealand historian (born 1938)

Dame Claudia Orange DNZM OBE CRSNZ
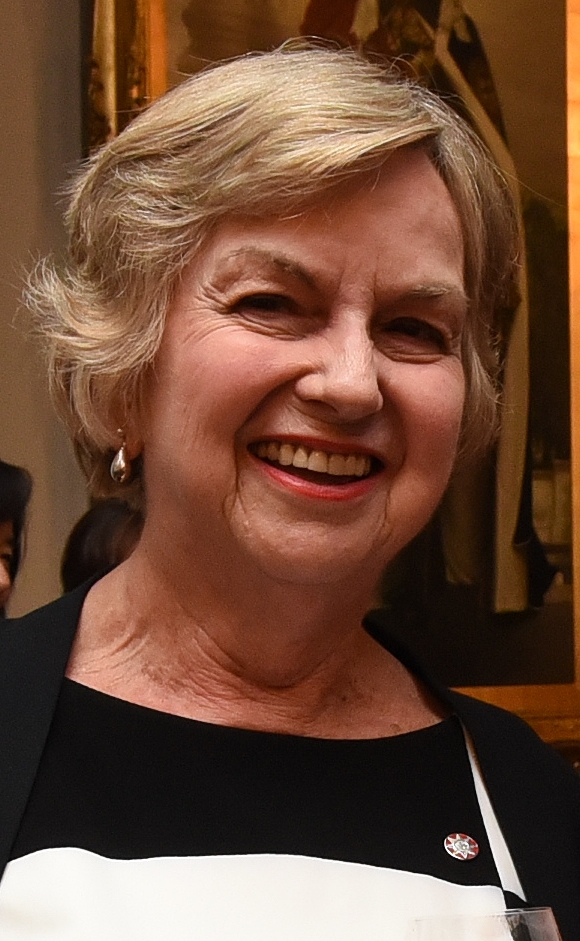
- Orange in 2017
- Born: Claudia Josepha Bell; 17 April 1938 (age 88); Auckland, New Zealand
- Education: University of Auckland
- Spouse: Rod Orange
- Children: Three
- Scientific career
- Fields: New Zealand history
- Theses: A kind of equality: Labour and the Maori people 1935–1949 (1977); The Treaty of Waitangi: a study of its making, interpretation and role in New Zealand history (1984)
- Doctoral advisor: Keith Sinclair

Dame Claudia Josepha Orange DNZM OBE CRSNZ (née Bell, born 17 April 1938) is a New Zealand historian best known for her 1987 book The Treaty of Waitangi, which won 'Book of the Year' at the Goodman Fielder Wattie Book Award in 1988.

Since 2013 she has been the head of research at the Museum of New Zealand Te Papa Tongarewa in Wellington, where she was previously the director of collections and research. In 2018 she was made a Companion of the Royal Society Te Apārangi in recognition of her service to the humanities.

== Personal life ==
Orange was born in Auckland in 1938. Her father, Monty Bell, was a fluent speaker of te reo Māori, knew Āpirana Ngata and joined the Department of Māori Affairs in Gisborne, so she grew up well aware of Māori issues. She trained and practised as a dental nurse for 15 years before starting university studies. Her 1977 master's thesis at the University of Auckland was titled A kind of equality: Labour and the Maori people, 1935–1949. She completed her PhD in 1984, also at the University of Auckland, and the title of this doctoral thesis was The Treaty of Waitangi: a study of its making, interpretation and role in New Zealand history. She is married to Rod Orange and has three adult children.

== Career ==
From 1975 to 1983 Orange was a history lecturer at the University of Auckland. From 1990 she was general editor of the Dictionary of New Zealand Biography, having been associate editor previously; she also worked on Te Ara: The Encyclopedia of New Zealand. She was also an associate editor for the new Dictionary of National Biography (Britain).

Between 1997 and 2000 she was acting chief historian of the History Branch in the Department of Internal Affairs. Late in 2003 she became director of history and Pacific cultures at the Museum of New Zealand Te Papa Tongarewa in Wellington. Since 2013 Orange has been the head of research at Te Papa.

Orange was the historian custodian of the "Treaty Road show", which was a tour around New Zealand sponsored by the New Zealand government. It attracted some public criticism as being ineffective and "an enormous disappointment" from her fellow historian Paul Moon.

=== The Treaty of Waitangi (1987) ===
The 1987 book was derived from her 1984 PhD thesis. Despite being an academic history, it was a popular success, due primarily to an upsurge in interest in the Treaty of Waitangi caused by the increasing importance of the Waitangi Tribunal and also major Māori protests at Waitangi Day celebrations. The book has become a definitive reference for interpreting the relevance of the Treaty of Waitangi. Several shorter versions of the book have been published for young and non-academic audiences, and a revised edition was released in 2011.

== Honours and awards ==
In 1990, Orange was awarded the New Zealand 1990 Commemoration Medal. In the 1993 New Year Honours, she was made an Officer of the Order of the British Empire, for services to historical research. She was appointed a Distinguished Companion of the New Zealand Order of Merit, also for services to historical research, in the 2009 New Year Honours. She accepted re-designation as a Dame Companion of the New Zealand Order of Merit in August 2009 following the restoration of titular honours by the New Zealand government.

In 2018, Orange was made a Companion of the Royal Society Te Apārangi in recognition of her work to improve awareness, knowledge and understanding of the Treaty of Waitangi, of New Zealand biography, and of the role of museums in communicating New Zealand's story.

In 2021, Orange received the Prime Minister's Award for Literary Achievement in Non-fiction.

== Published works ==
- The Covenant of Kohimarama (1979).
- Orange, Claudia (1987). The Treaty of Waitangi. Wellington: Allen & Unwin. ISBN 0868616346.
- The Story of a Treaty (Bridget Williams Books, 1989).
- An Illustrated History of the Treaty of Waitangi (Allen & Unwin, 1990).
- An Illustrated History of the Treaty of Waitangi (2nd edition, Bridget Williams Books, 2004).
- The Treaty of Waitangi, 2nd edition (Bridget Williams Books, 2011).
- The Story of a Treaty, 2nd edition (Bridget Williams Books, 2013).
- The Story of a Treaty | He Kōrero Tiriti, 3rd edition (Bridget Williams Books, 2023) ISBN 9781990046780.
