= Jim Traue =

New Zealand librarian (1932–2023)

Jim Traue ONZM

5th Chief librarian of the Alexander Turnbull Library
- In office 1973–1990
- Preceded by: Graham Bagnall
- Succeeded by: Margaret Calder

Personal details
- Born: James Edward Traue; 10 February 1932 Auckland, New Zealand
- Died: 13 November 2023 (aged 91) Wellington, New Zealand
- Spouse: Julia Margaret Bergen (m. 1973)
- Profession: Librarian

James Edward Traue ONZM (10 February 1932 – 13 November 2023) was a New Zealand librarian. He was chief librarian of the Alexander Turnbull Library from 1973 to 1990.

== Early life ==
James Edward Traue was born in Auckland on 10 February 1932, the son of Albert Edward Traue and Evelin Florence Traue (née Webb). He was educated at Rotorua District High School and Hamilton High School, and went on to study at Auckland University College, graduating Master of Arts with second-class honours in 1957. He also earned a Diploma of the New Zealand Library School.

== Career ==
Traue worked as a librarian with the New Zealand National Library Service from 1957 to 1961. He worked at the General Assembly Library from 1962 to 1971, spending 1965–1966 working at the Library of Congress in Washington, D.C. He was chief librarian of the New Zealand Department of Scientific and Industrial Research between 1971 and 1973. Traue served as chief librarian of the Alexander Turnbull Library, part of the National Library of New Zealand in Wellington, from 1973 until 1990.

In 1961, Traue was a member of the National Committee for the Abolition of the Death Penalty. He was editor of the 11th edition of Who's Who in New Zealand in 1978. He wrote extensively on the history and purpose of research libraries and the nature of research. In 1984 he visited London at the invitation of the British Library followed by trips to libraries in Belgium and Canada, and reported that conservation efforts in these libraries made New Zealand's efforts seem "puny" by comparison. In 1988 he visited libraries in the United States to negotiate the borrowing of rare books for an exhibition planned in 1990 or 1991.

After leaving the Alexander Turnbull Library in June 1990, Traue took up a teaching fellowship at the librarianship department of Victoria University of Wellington. He subsequently became a senior associate in the School of Communications and Information Management at the university. In 1999, he received a Marsden grant of $110,000 over three years to research the role played by public libraries, commercial booksellers and local publishers in colonial New Zealand, and to study New Zealanders' reading patterns from 1840 to 1960.

In 2004, Traue wrote an article for The Dominion Post expressing his concerns about planned changes to the Victoria University library. The article was edited by the newspaper before publication without his approval, and Traue's complaint to the New Zealand Press Council about these edits was upheld. In 2009 he criticised planned developments to the National Library, responsible for the Turnbull collections, on the basis that it was "designed to be the library community's reserve bank, not just another Wellington retail bank trying to maximise the number of customers coming through the front door".

== Personal life and death ==
In 1973, Traue married Julia Bergen, the head librarian at Wellington Teachers' College. He died in Wellington on 13 November 2023, at the age of 91.

== Honours ==
In the 2006 Queen's Birthday Honours, Traue was appointed an Officer of the New Zealand Order of Merit, for services to the library profession.
