= W. H. Oliver =

New Zealand historian and poet

W. H. Oliver CBE
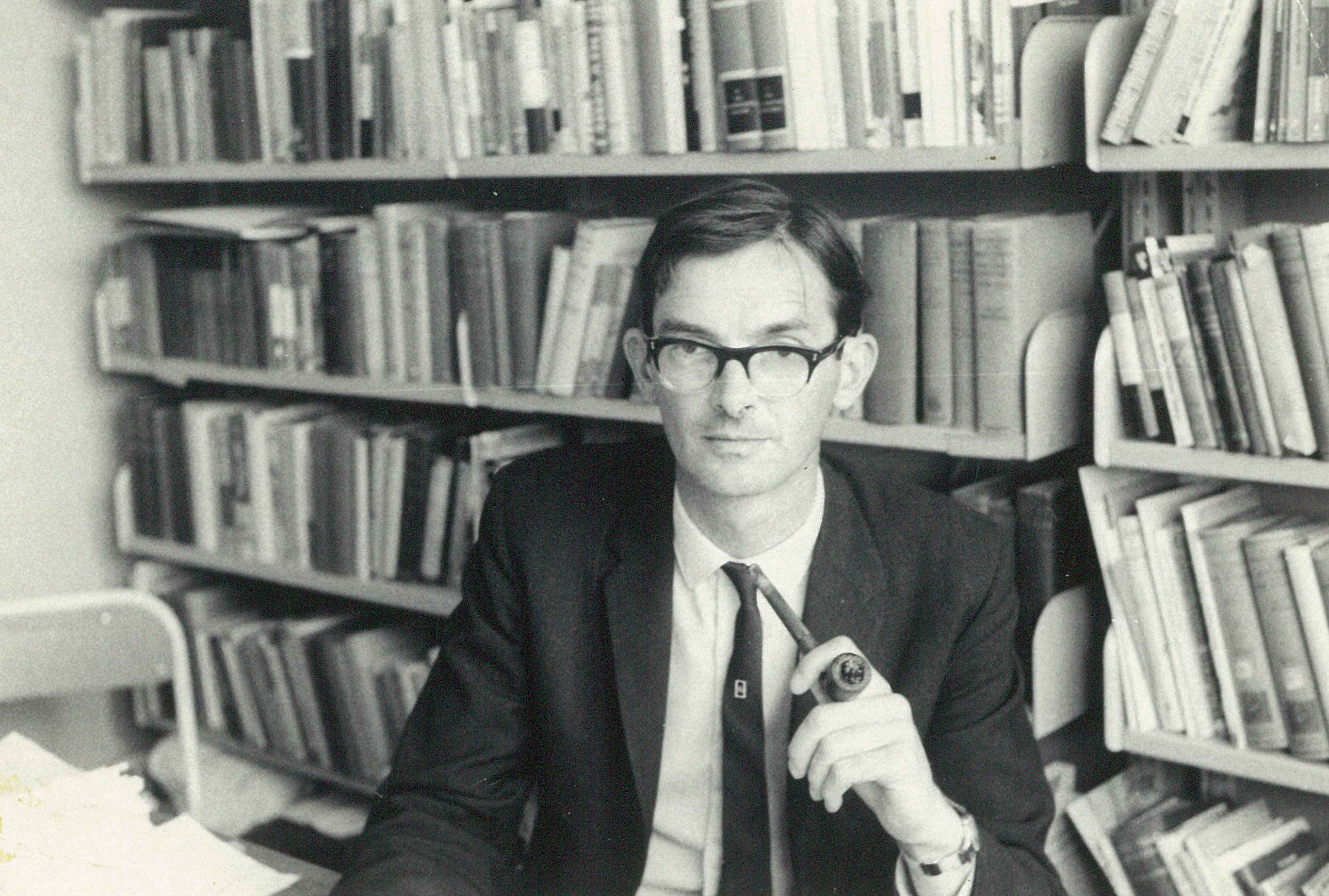
- Born: William Hosking Oliver; 14 May 1925; Feilding, New Zealand
- Died: 16 September 2015 (aged 90); Wellington, New Zealand
- Other name: Bill Oliver
- Occupations: Historian, poet, biographer
- Spouse: Dorothy Nielsen
- Children: 6

Academic background
- Education: University of Oxford
- Thesis: Organizations and ideas behind the efforts to achieve a general union of the working classes in the early 1830's (1954)

Academic work
- Discipline: History
- Institutions: University of Canterbury; Victoria University of Wellington; Massey University
- Doctoral students: Margaret Tennant

William Hosking Oliver CBE (14 May 1925 – 16 September 2015), commonly known as W. H. Oliver but also known as Bill Oliver, was a New Zealand historian and poet. From 1983, Oliver led the development of the Dictionary of New Zealand Biography.

== Life ==
Oliver was born in Feilding in 1925 to Ethel Amelia Oliver and her husband, William Henry Oliver, both Cornish immigrants. His father was a member of the Labour Party and stood in the Oroua electorate in the 1935 election, and the Manawatu electorate in 1943.

During his youth, the family moved to Dannevirke, where he received his schooling at Dannevirke High School. Upon leaving school at 18, he moved to Wellington where he studied at Victoria University of Wellington (MA), followed by three years of lecturing at that institution. He married Dorothy Nielsen, whom he had met at a Christian conference in Christchurch, and had five sons and one daughter with her.

In 1951, the Olivers moved to the United Kingdom, where he completed a D.Phil at the University of Oxford in 1953. They returned to New Zealand and he lectured at the University of Canterbury and Victoria, before becoming the inaugural professor of history at Massey University in 1965, where he later served as Dean of Humanities. He was made emeritus professor on leaving Massey in 1983 to become general editor of the Dictionary of New Zealand Biography (DNZB). He wrote extensively on New Zealand history and published several volumes of poetry. In the 1990 New Year Honours, he was appointed a Commander of the Order of the British Empire, for services to historical research, and also in 1990 he was awarded the New Zealand 1990 Commemoration Medal, and an honorary DLitt from Victoria University of Wellington in recognition of his services to history. In 2008, he was honoured in the Prime Minister's Awards for Literary Achievement in the non-fiction genre.

Oliver died in Wellington on 16 September 2015. His wife had died of pancreatic cancer during the time that he worked on the DNZB.

== Works ==
=== History and biography ===
- 1954: Organizations and ideas behind the efforts to achieve a general union of the working classes in the early 1830's [sic] PhD thesis, Faculty of Social Studies, University of Oxford.
- 1960: The Story of New Zealand, London: Faber
- 1960: Poetry in New Zealand, Wellington: School Publications
- 1964: Problems and prospects of conservatism in New Zealand, Wellington: New Zealand National Party
- 1968: Further steps towards a welfare state since 1935, Auckland: Heinemann Educational Books
- 1971: Challenge and response: a study of the development of the Gisborne East Coast region, Gisborne: East Coast Development Research Association
- 1978: Prophets and Millennialists, Auckland: Auckland University Press
- 1981: The Oxford History of New Zealand, co-edited with Bridget Williams, Wellington: Oxford University Press
- 1983: James K. Baxter: A Portrait, Wellington: Port Nicholson Press. ISBN 0908635060.
- 1990: Dictionary of New Zealand Biography, volume one, 1769–1869, (ed.), Wellington: Allen & Unwin/Department of Internal Affairs
- 1991: Claims to the Waitangi Tribunal, Wellington: Waitangi Tribunal
- 1996: The certainty of doubt: tributes to Peter Munz, (co-edited with Miles Fairburn), Wellington: Victoria University Press
- 1997: The social and economic situation of Hauraki Maori after colonisation, Paeroa: Hauraki Maori Trust Board
- 2002: Looking for the Phoenix: A Memoir, Wellington: Bridget Williams Books

=== Poetry ===
Books of poetry:

- 1957: Fire Without Phoenix: Poems 1946–1954, Christchurch: Caxton Press
- 1980: Out of Season: Poems, Wellington; New York: Oxford University Press
- 1982: Poor Richard: Poems, Wellington: Port Nicholson Press
- 1993: Bodily Presence: Words, Paintings, co-author: Anne Munz; Wellington: BlackBerry Press
- 2005: Selected Poems, Wellington: Victoria University Press
