= Dendrite (crystal) =

Crystal that develops with a typical multi-branching form

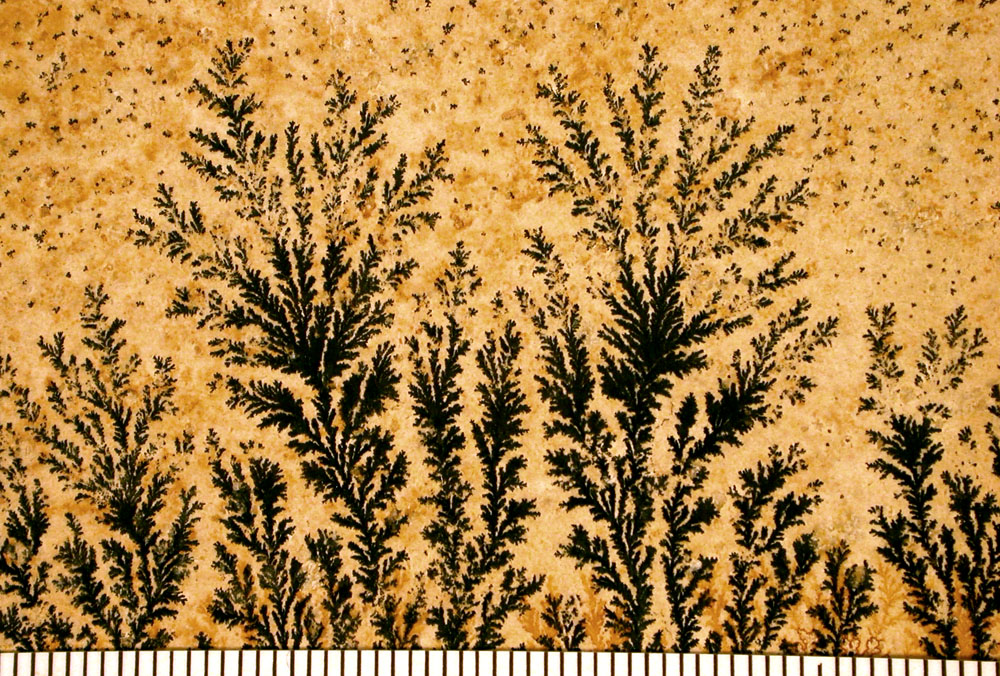
Manganese dendrites on a limestone bedding plane from Solnhofen, Germany. Scale in mm.

Simulation of dendritic solidification in a supercooled pure liquid using the phase-field model developed by Kobayashi.

A crystal dendrite is a crystal that develops with a typical multi-branching form, resembling a fractal. The name comes from the Ancient Greek word δένδρον (déndron), which means "tree", since the crystal's structure resembles that of a tree. These crystals can be synthesised by using a supercooled pure liquid, however they are also quite common in nature. The most common crystals in nature exhibit dendritic growth are snowflakes and frost on windows, but many minerals and metals can also be found in dendritic structures.

== History ==
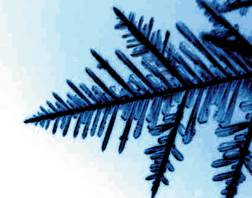
Ice dendrite formation on a snowflake

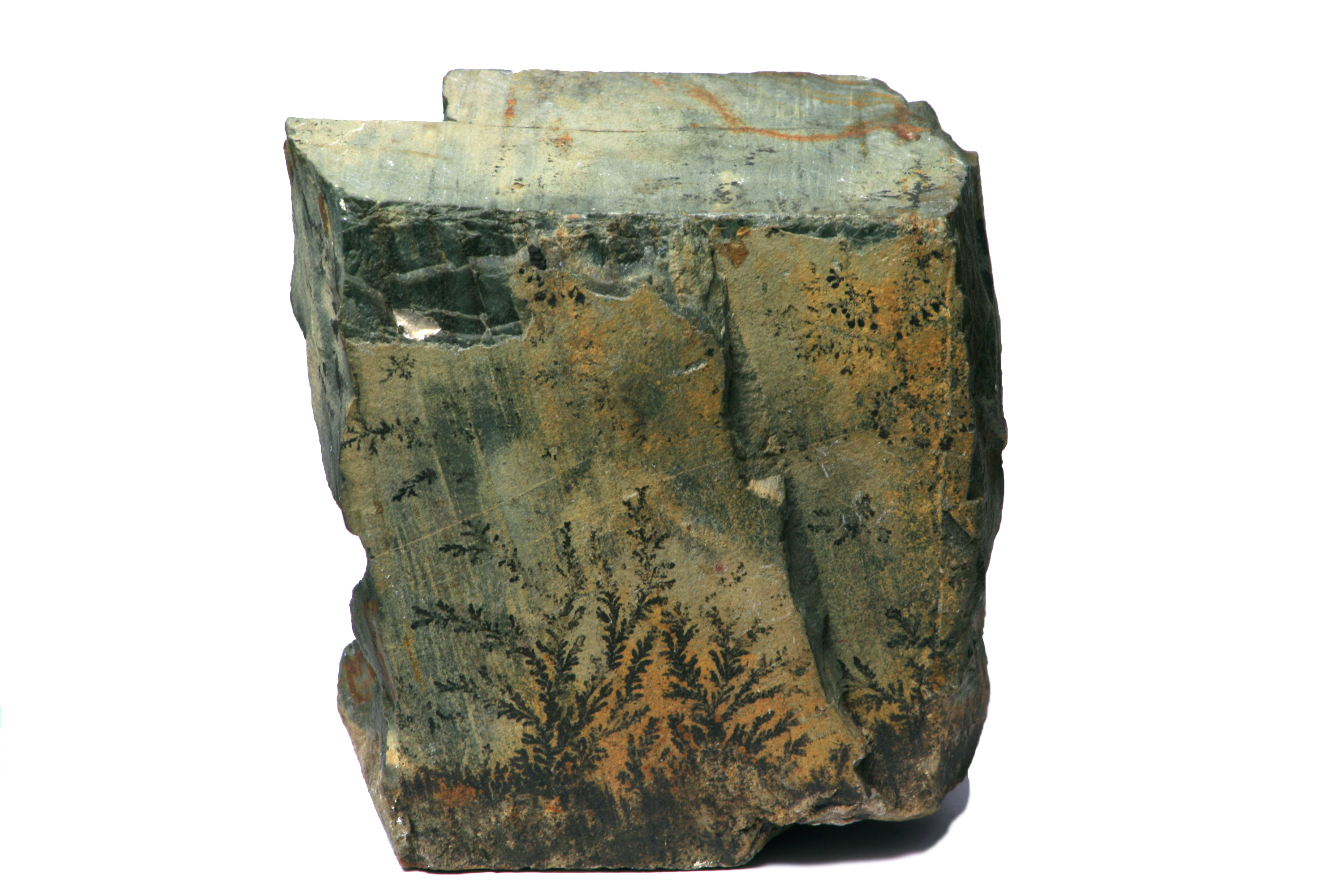
Example of a dendrite on pyrolusite.

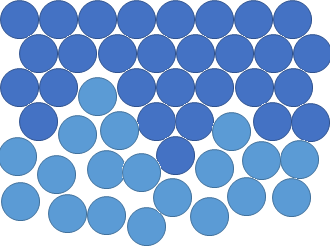
A simplified diagram for a rough solid-liquid interface at the atomic level.

=== Maximum velocity principle ===
The first dendritic patterns were discovered in palaeontology and are often mistaken for fossils because of their appearance. The first theory for the creation of these patterns was published by Nash and Glicksman in 1974, they used a very mathematical method and derived a non-linear integro-differential equation for a classical needle growth. However they only found an inaccurate numerical solution close to the tip of the needle and they found that under a given growth condition, the tip velocity has a unique maximum value. This became known as the maximum velocity principle (MVP) but was ruled out by Glicksman and Nash themselves very quickly. In the following two years Glicksman improved the numerical methods used, but did not realise the non-linear integro-differential equation had no mathematical solutions making his results meaningless.

=== Marginal stability hypothesis ===
Four years later, in 1978, Langer and Müller-Krumbhaar proposed the marginal stability hypothesis (MSH). This hypothesis used a stability parameter σ which depended on the thermal diffusivity, the surface tension and the radius of the tip of the dendrite. They claimed a system would be unstable for small σ causing it to form dendrites. At the time however Langer and Müller-Krumbhaar were unable to obtain a stability criterion for certain growth systems which led to the MSH theory being abandoned.

=== Microscopic solvability condition ===
A decade later several groups of researchers went back to the Nash-Glicksman problem and focused on simplified versions of it. Through this they found that the problem for isotropic surface tension had no solutions. This result meant that a system with a steady needle growth solution necessarily needed to have some type of anisotropic surface tension. This breakthrough lead to the microscopic solvability condition theory (MSC), however this theory still failed since although for isotropic surface tension there could not be a steady solution, it was experimentally shown that there were nearly steady solutions which the theory did not predict.

=== Macroscopic continuum model ===
Nowadays the best understanding for dendritic crystals comes in the form of the macroscopic continuum model which assumes that both the solid and the liquid parts of the system are continuous media and the interface is a surface. This model uses the microscopic structure of the material and uses the general understanding of nucleation to accurately predict how a dendrite will grow.

== Dendrite formation ==
Dendrite formation starts with some nucleation, i.e. the first appearance of solid growth, in the supercooled liquid. This formation will at first grow spherically until this shape is no longer stable. This instability has two causes: anisotropy in the surface energy of the solid/liquid interface and the attachment kinetics of particles to crystallographic planes when they have formed.

On the solid-liquid interface, we can define a surface energy, $\gamma_{sl}$, which is the excess energy at the liquid-solid interface to accommodate the structural changes at the interface.

For a spherical interface, the Gibbs–Thomson equation then gives a melting point depression compared to a flat interface $\Delta T_m$, which has the relation

$$\Delta T_m \propto \frac{\gamma_{sl}}{r}$$

where $r$ is the radius of the sphere. This curvature undercooling, the effective lowering of the melting point at the interface, sustains the spherical shape for small radii.

However, anisotropy in the surface energy implies that the interface will deform to find the energetically most favourable shape. For cubic symmetry in 2D we can express this anisotropy in the surface energy as

$$\gamma_{sl}(\theta) = \gamma_{sl}^0[1 + \epsilon \cos(4\theta)].$$

This gives rise to a surface stiffness

$$\gamma_{sl}^0[1 - 15\epsilon \cos(4\theta)]$$

where we note that this quantity is positive for all angles $\theta$ when $\epsilon < 1/15$. In this case we speak of "weak anisotropy". For larger values of $\epsilon$, the "strong anisotropy" causes the surface stiffness to be negative for some $\theta$. This means that these orientations cannot appear, leading to so-called 'faceted' crystals, i.e. the interface would be a crystallographic plane inhibiting growth along this part of the interface due to attachment kinetics.

=== Wulff construction ===
For both above and below the critical anisotropy the Wulff construction provides a method to determine the shape of the crystal. In principle, we can understand the deformation as an attempt by the system to minimise the area with the highest effective surface energy.

=== Growth velocity ===
Taking into account attachment kinetics, we can derive that both for spherical growth and for flat surface growth, the growth velocity decreases with time by $t^{-1/2}$. We do however find stable parabolic growth, where the length grows with $t$ and the width with $\sqrt{t}$. Therefore, growth mainly takes place at the tip the parabolic interface, which draws out longer and longer. Eventually, the sides of this parabolic tip will also exhibit instabilities giving a dendrite its characteristic shape.

=== Preferred growth direction ===
When dendrites start to grow with tips in different directions, they display their underlying crystal structure, as this structure causes the anisotropy in surface energy. For instance, a dendrite growing with BCC crystal structure will have a preferred growth direction along the $\langle 100 \rangle$ directions. The table below gives an overview of preferred crystallographic directions for dendritic growth. Note that when the strain energy minimisation effect dominates over surface energy minimisation, one might find a different growth direction, such as with Cr, which has as a preferred growth direction $\langle 111 \rangle$, even though it is a BCC latice.

Preferred growth direction for common crystal structures
Crystal structure	Preferred growth direction	Examples
FCC	$\langle 100 \rangle$	$\ce{Al}$, $\ce{Cu}$, $\ce{Ni}$, $\ce{\gamma-Fe}$
BCC	$\langle 100 \rangle$	$\ce{\delta - Fe}$, Succinonitrile ($\ce{SCN}$), $\ce{NH_4Cl}$ ($\ce{CsCl}$-type)
Tetragonal	$\langle 110 \rangle$	$\ce{Sn}$
HCP	$\langle 10\bar{1}0 \rangle$	$\ce{Zn}$, $\ce{H_2O}$

== Metal dendrites ==
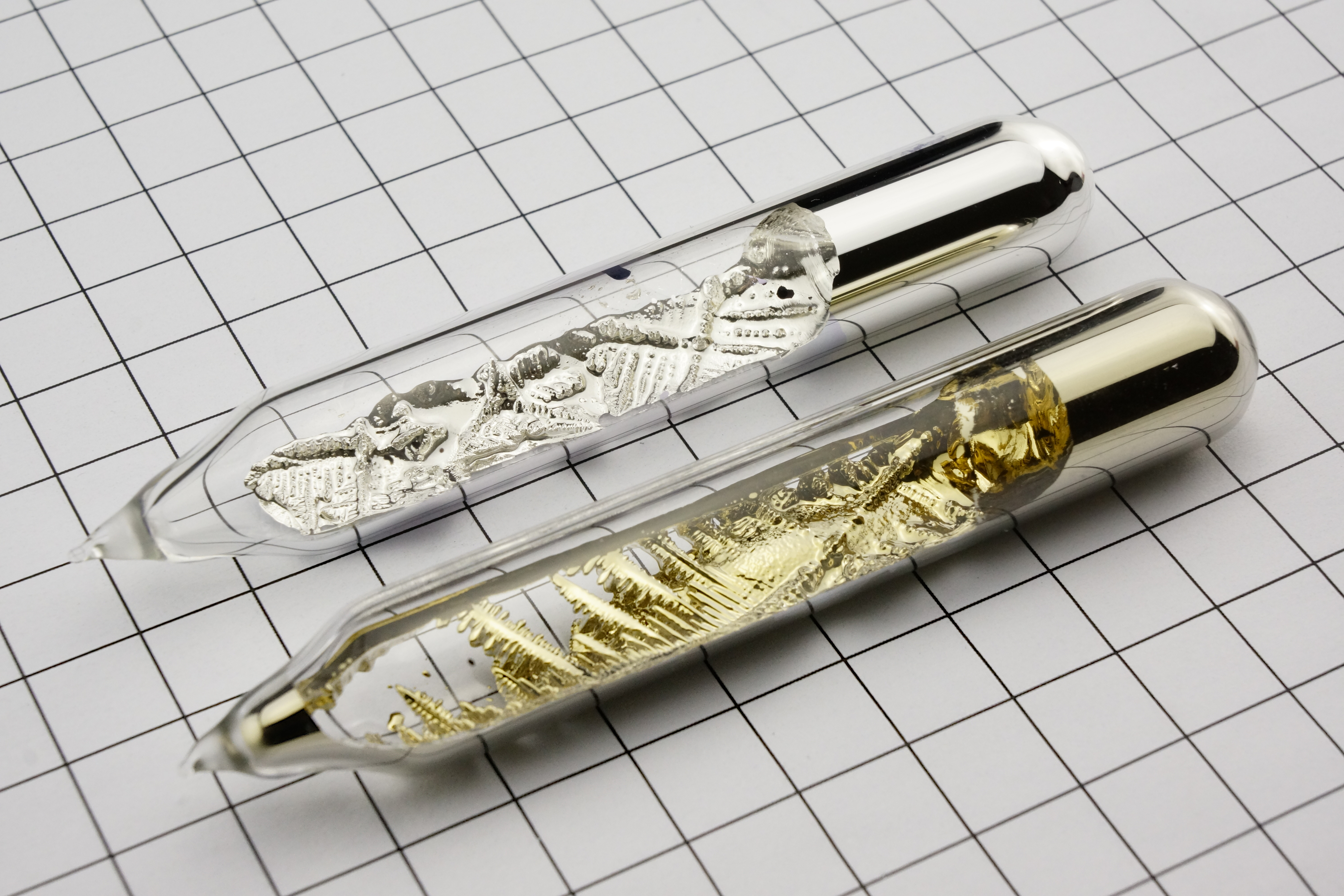
Dendritic crystallization after melting inside sealed ampules of rubidium and caesium metal.

For metals the process of forming dendrites is very similar to other crystals, but the kinetics of attachment play a much smaller role. This is because the interface is atomically rough; because of the small difference in structure between the liquid and the solid state, the transition from liquid to solid is somewhat gradual and one observes some interface thickness. Consequently, the surface energy will become nearly isotropic. For this reason, one would not expect faceted crystals as found for atomically smooth interfaces observed in crystals of more complex molecules.

== Mineralogy and paleontology ==
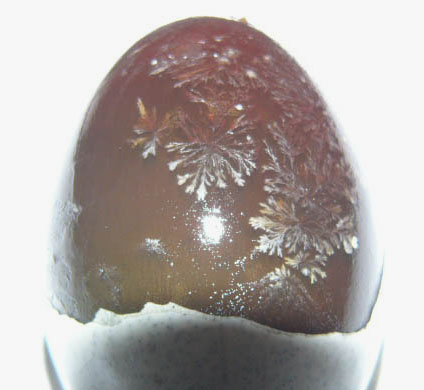
Branching dendrites of salt (sodium chloride) on the surface of a century egg.

In paleontology, dendritic mineral crystal forms are often mistaken for fossils. These pseudofossils form as naturally occurring fissures in the rock are filled by percolating mineral solutions. They form when water rich in manganese and iron flows along fractures and bedding planes between layers of limestone and other rock types, depositing dendritic crystals as the solution flows through. A variety of manganese oxides and hydroxides are involved, including:

- birnessite (Na_{4}Mn_{14}O_{27}•9H_{2}O)
- coronadite (PbMn_{8}O_{16})
- cryptomelane (KMn_{8}O_{16})
- hollandite (BaMn_{8}O_{16})
- romanechite ((Ba,H_{2}O)Mn_{5}O_{10})
- todorokite ((Ba,Mn,Mg,Ca,K,Na)_{2}Mn_{3}O_{12}•3H_{2}O) and others.

A three-dimensional form of dendrite develops in fissures in quartz, forming moss agate.

== NASA microgravity experiment ==
Animated GIF of dendrite formation - NASA

The Isothermal Dendritic Growth Experiment (IDGE) was a materials science solidification experiment that researchers used on Space Shuttle missions to investigate dendritic growth in an environment where the effect of gravity (convection in the liquid) could be excluded. The experimental results indicated that at lower supercooling (up to 1.3 K), these convective effects are indeed significant. Compared to the growth in microgravity, the tip velocity during dendritic growth under normal gravity was found to be up to several times greater.

== See also ==
- Brownian tree
- Monocrystalline whisker
- Patterns in nature
- STS-87—Space Shuttle mission featuring the Isothermal Dendritic Growth Experiment
- Whisker (metallurgy)
