= Guy Scholefield =

New Zealand journalist, historian, archivist, librarian, editor (1877–1963)

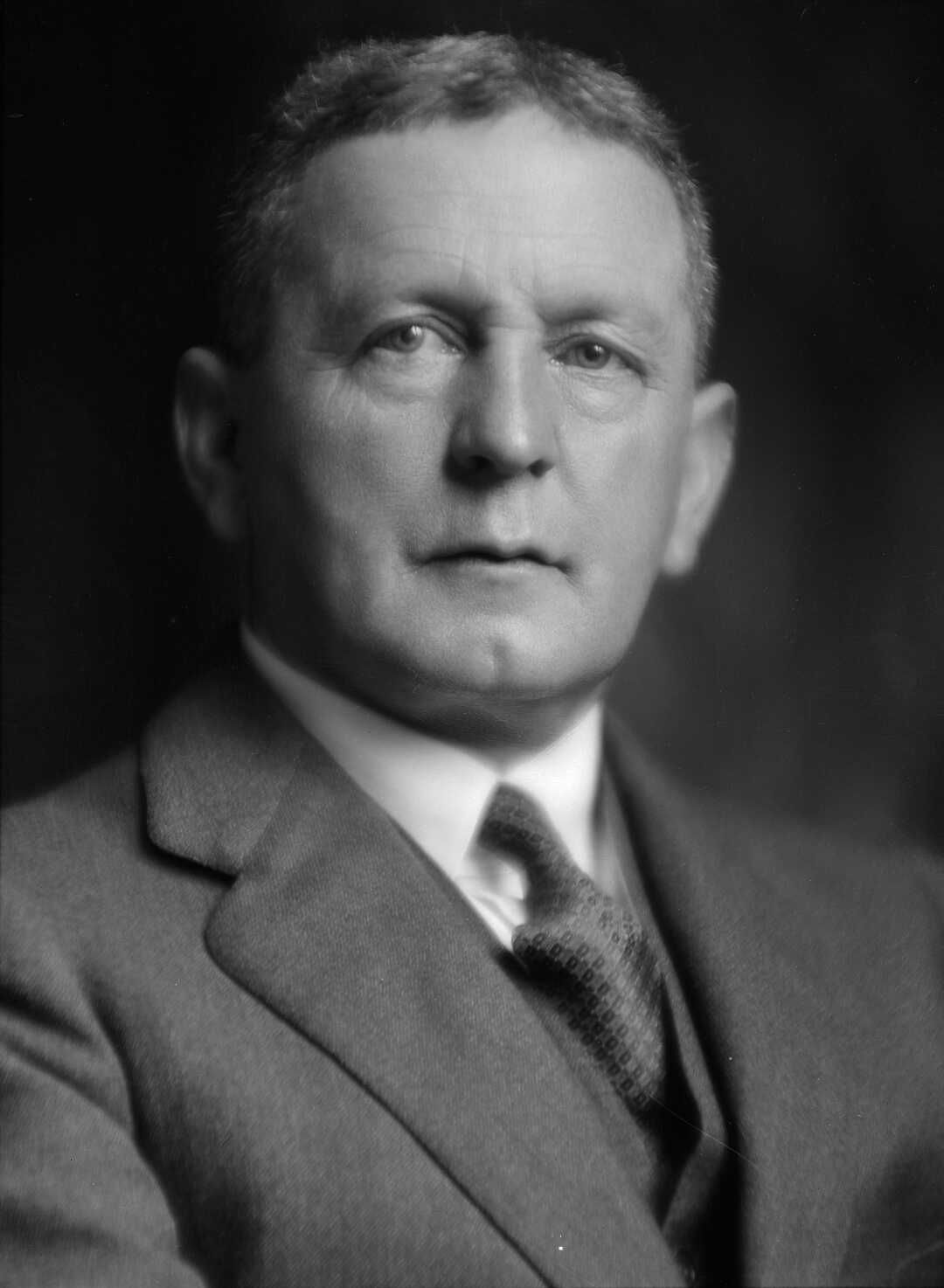
Scholefield in 1929

Guy Hardy Scholefield CMG OBE (17 June 1877 – 19 July 1963) was a New Zealand journalist, historian, archivist, librarian and editor, known primarily as the compiler of the 1940 version of the Dictionary of New Zealand Biography.

== Early life ==
Scholefield was born in Dunedin, New Zealand, on 17 June 1877. His father, John Hoick Scholefield, was an accountant. Marion, née Hardy, was his mother. After his father's death in 1885, the family relocated to Milton, where he received his secondary education at Tokomairiro District High School.

== Professional life ==
Scholefield started work at 16 at the Bruce Herald as compositor and journalist. He then became a clerk at the Bruce Woollen Manufacturing Company, but produced material for print publications on the side. He moved to Wellington in 1899 and joined The New Zealand Times, where he enjoyed much journalistic freedom working on biographies of notable New Zealanders. He was admitted to the parliamentary press gallery in 1901.

Scholefield then undertook part-time study at Victoria University College. When he transferred his studies to Christchurch to continue at Canterbury College, he became associate editor of The Press; he held that role in 1903 and 1904. Returning to Wellington, he became chief of staff at The New Zealand Times in 1907. In the following year, he worked on the inaugural edition of Who's who in New Zealand and the western Pacific alongside Emil Schwabe. In 1908, he became the London correspondent for the New Zealand Associated Press, a role in which he stayed until 1919.

During the First World War, he worked as a war correspondent in Europe and founded a newspaper for New Zealand expatriates resident in the United Kingdom. He studied at the London School of Economics and Political Science and graduated with a Bachelor of Science in 1915, and a Doctor of Science in 1919. In the 1919 King's Birthday Honours, Scholefield was appointed as an Officer of the Order of the British Empire for his services as a war correspondent.

Scholefield returned to New Zealand in late 1919 and settled in Masterton, where he subsequently became the editor of the regional newspaper Wairarapa Age. He was appointed chief parliamentary librarian in May 1926, a position he would hold until March 1948, succeeding Charles Wilson. In addition, he was also made dominion archivist, a role which he saw as being important for research. He remained interested in biographical research on notable New Zealanders, and in 1940 published the two-volume Dictionary of New Zealand Biography as part of New Zealand's centennial. It contained around 2,250 biographical sketches, the majority of which were authored by Scholefield. In a review for The New Zealand Herald, it was described as "one of the most permanently valuable works of reference yet produced in the Dominion". Scholefield intended for a third volume to be published at a later date but this never eventuated despite his enthusiasm for the project.

He was appointed as a Companion of the Order of St Michael and St George in the 1948 New Year Honours, in recognition of his services as parliamentary librarian and national archivist.

== Family ==
On 17 June 1908, Scholefield married Adela Lucy Stapylton Bree at St Paul's Cathedral in Wellington. They left for London later that same month. The Scholefields had two sons and one daughter. He died in Wellington on 19 July 1963.

== Bibliography ==
- Scholefield, Guy; Schwabe, Emil, eds. (1908). Who's Who in New Zealand and the Western Pacific (1st ed.). Masterton: Guy Scholefield.
- Scholefield, Guy (1909). New Zealand in Evolution: Industrial, economic and political. London: Fisher Unwin.
- Scholefield, Guy (1919). The Pacific, Its Past and Future: And the policy of the great powers from the eighteenth century. London: John Murray.
- Scholefield, Guy, ed. (1925) [First published in 1908]. Who's Who in New Zealand and the Western Pacific (2nd ed.). Masterton: Guy Scholefield.
- Scholefield, Guy (1925) [First published in 1913]. New Zealand Parliamentary Record (2nd ed.). Wellington: Government Printer.
- Scholefield, Guy (1931). History of the Tokomairiro District High School, 1856-1931: With an abridged report of the seventy-fifth anniversary celebrations, April 4–7, 1931. Wellington: Harry H. Tombs.
- Scholefield, Guy (1934). Captain William Hobson, First Governor of New Zealand. Oxford: Oxford University Press.
- Scholefield, Guy (1938). A Union Catalogue of New Zealand Newspapers: Preserved in public libraries, newspaper offices, etc. Wellington: Government Printer.
- Scholefield, Guy (1950) [First published in 1913]. New Zealand Parliamentary Record, 1840–1949 (3rd ed.). Wellington: Government Printer.
- Scholefield, Guy, ed. (1940). A Dictionary of New Zealand Biography : A–L (PDF). Vol. I. Wellington: Department of Internal Affairs. Archived (PDF) from the original on 9 March 2012.
- Scholefield, Guy, ed. (1940). A Dictionary of New Zealand Biography : M–Addenda (PDF). Vol. II. Wellington: Department of Internal Affairs. Archived (PDF) from the original on 27 March 2014.
- Scholefield, Guy (1946). Epic Year, 1893. Dunedin: Star Print.
- Scholefield, Guy (1946). Notable New Zealand Statesmen: Twelve Prime Ministers. Christchurch: Whitcombe & Tombs.
- Scholefield, Guy (1958). Newspapers in New Zealand. Wellington: A.H. and A.W. Reed.
- Scholefield, Guy (1959). A Checklist of Newspapers in New Zealand Libraries 1938-1959: A provisional supplement to the union catalogue of New Zealand newspapers, 1938. Wellington: General Assembly Library.
- Scholefield, Guy, ed. (1960). The Richmond-Atkinson Papers, 1841–1862. Vol. I. Wellington: Government Printer.
- Scholefield, Guy, ed. (1960). The Richmond-Atkinson Papers, 1863–1906. Vol. II. Wellington: Government Printer.
