= Diana's Tree =

Substance in alchemy

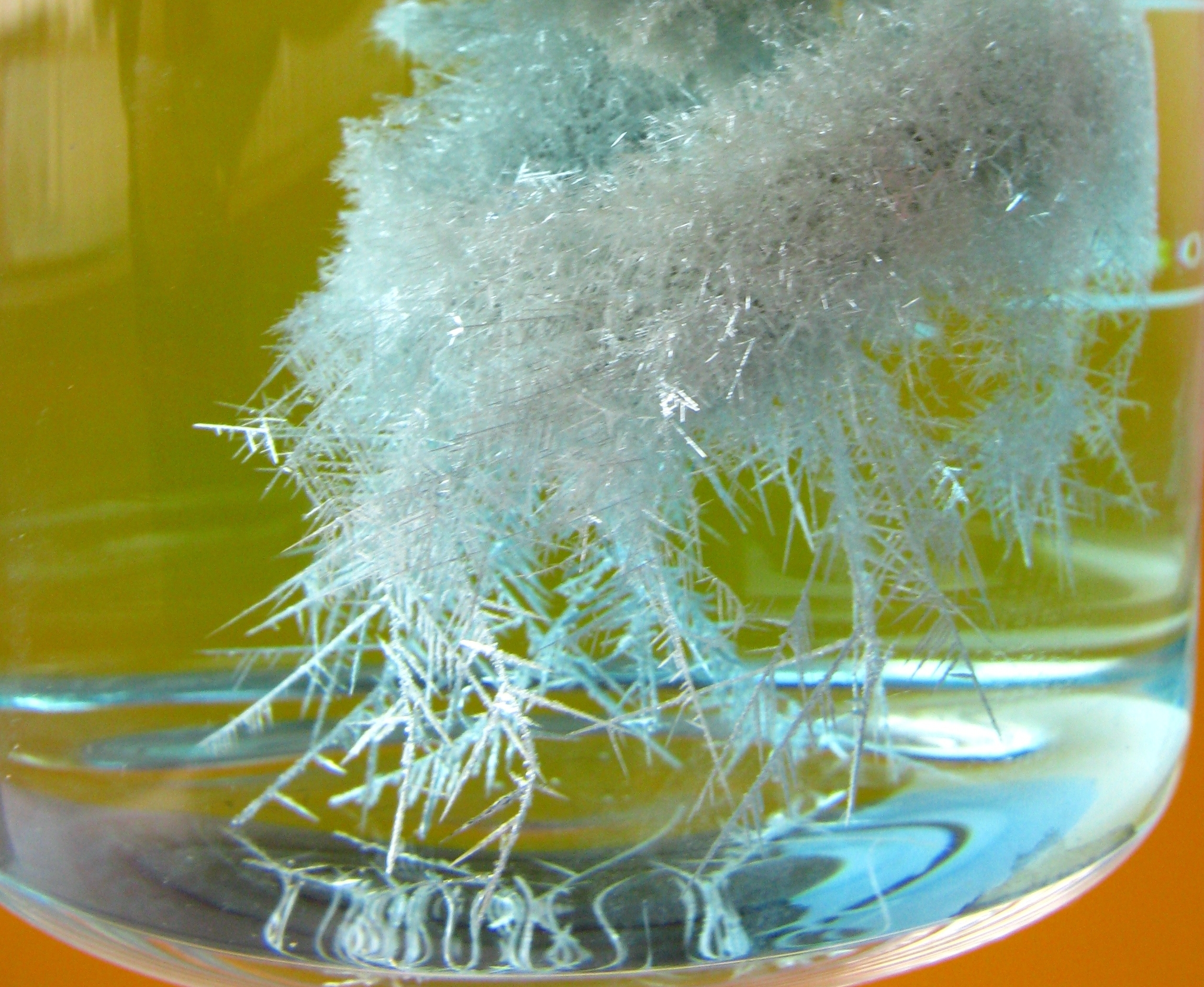
Well-developed Diana's tree grown up over copper rod from silver/mercury amalgam placed in 0.1 M solution of silver nitrate – reaction time 2 hours.

Diana's Tree (Latin: Arbor Diana or Dianae), also known as the Philosopher's Tree (Arbor Philosophorum), was considered a precursor to the philosopher's stone and resembled coral in regards to its structure. It is a dendritic amalgam of crystallized silver, obtained from mercury in a solution of silver nitrate; so-called by the alchemists, among whom Diana, goddess of the moon, stood for silver, planetary metal of the moon. The arborescence of this amalgam, which even included fruit-like forms on its branches, led pre-modern chemical philosophers to theorize the existence of life in the kingdom of minerals.

== As an alchemical product ==
Alchemy was a series of practices that combined philosophical, magical, and chemical experimentation. One goal of European alchemists was to create what was known as the Philosopher’s Stone, a substance that when heated and combined with a non precious metal like copper or iron (known as the “base”) would turn into gold. Although now considered a pseudoscience, the practice of alchemy has contributed experimental techniques to the chemistry world such as the process of distillation and sublimation. The Tree of Diana was thought to be a precursor to the Philosopher's Stone: experiments involving the Tree aimed to turn non precious metals into precious metals like gold or silver, similar to the Stone.

In pre-modern chemistry, the various methods for procuring Diana's Tree were exceedingly time-consuming; for example, the following process, originally described by Nicolas Lemery, required forty days to see results:

Dissolve an ounce of pure silver in a sufficient quantity of aqua fortis, exceedingly pure, and of a moderate strength, and having put the solution in a jar, dilute it with about twenty ounces of distilled water. Then add two ounces of mercury, and leave the whole at rest. In the course of forty days, there will rise from the mercury a kind of tree, which throwing out branches will represent natural vegetation.

Giambattista della Porta in the 16th century described it this way:

Dissolve Silver in Aquafortis, evaporate into thin air at the fire, that there may remain at the bottom a thick unctious substance. Then Distill fountain water twice or thrice, and pour it on the thick matter, shaking it well. Then let it stand a little, and pour into another glass vessel the most pure water, in which the Silver is. Add to the water a pound of Quicksilver, in a most transparent crystalline glass that will attract to it that Silver. And in the space of a day there will spring up a most beautiful tree from the bottom, and hairy, as made of most fine beards of Corn, and it will fill the whole vessel, that the eye can behold nothing more pleasant. The same is made of Gold with Aquaregia.

The quickest method, as described by German natural philosopher Wilhelm Homberg (1652–1715), took about a quarter of an hour, and is described as follows:

Take four drams of filings of fine silver, with which make an amalgam, without heat, with two drams of quicksilver. Dissolve this amalgam in four ounces of aqua fortis, and pour the solution into three gallons of water. Stir it for a while until mixed, and then keep it in a glass vessel well stopped. To initiate the experiment, take about an ounce of the substance, and put it in a small vial; add to this a quantity the size of a pea of the ordinary amalgam of gold, or silver, which should be as soft as butter. Let the vial rest for two or three minutes. Immediately after this, several small filaments will visibly arise perpendicularly from the little bulb of the amalgam, which will grow and thrust out small branches in the form of a tree. The ball of amalgam will grow hard, like a pellet of white earth, and the little tree will be bright silver in color.

The form of this metallic tree may be varied as desired. The stronger the user makes the first described water, the thicker the tree will be with branches, and sooner formed. Homberg also described how numerous other kinds of trees may be produced by crystallization and "digestion".

=== "Sophic mercury", George Starkey, and Isaac Newton ===
17th century American alchemist George Starkey, who wrote under the pen name "Eirenaeus Philalethes", had a recipe for "sophick mercury" that produced a branch-like structure consisting of an alloy of gold and mercury. His process involved the repeated distillation of the mercury, which he then heated while adding gold to produce the structure. In one version, a small seed of gold is mixed with mercury to create the "Philosopher’s Tree"; at the time Starkey was writing, the creation of gold from gold itself was viewed as being obviously possible. In 2018, Starkey's methods, including the above "Philosopher's Tree" were reconstructed by historian of science Lawrence Principe.

In 2016, a copy of Starkey's recipe for making the Tree of Diana was discovered in a manuscript by Isaac Newton; however, there is no evidence that Newton attempted the process. Newton kept his experiments on alchemy a secret, as the practice was illegal in England at the time. In addition, much of Newton's work regarding alchemy was lost in a fire supposedly started by his dog.

=== Other forms of the Tree ===
There is also Saturn's Tree, which was a deposit of crystallized lead, massed together in the form of a "tree". It is produced by a shaving of zinc in a solution of the lead(II) acetate. In alchemy, Saturn was associated with lead.

== Modern experimentation ==
Experiments with the Tree of Diana have inspired modern chemists to replicate its creation, using the process to analyze reactions between metals and other substances. A 1967 experiment at the University of Seattle studied the reaction between solid copper and aqueous silver nitrate. In it, silver ions reacted with the copper metal to form a crystal structure, and this reaction continued until the concentration of silver ions was exhausted.
