= George Peterson =

George Peterson may refer to:

- George N. Peterson Jr. (born 1950), member of the Massachusetts House of Representatives
- George Peterson (Medal of Honor) (1912–1945), U.S. Army soldier and Medal of Honor recipient
- G. P. "Bud" Peterson (George Paul Peterson, born 1952), president of the Georgia Institute of Technology and ex-chancellor of the University of Colorado at Boulder
- George Peterson (pirate) (fl. 1686–1688), pirate active off New England, Nova Scotia, and the West Indies
