= George Petersen (biochemist) =

New Zealand biochemist (1933–2021)

George Petersen ONZM
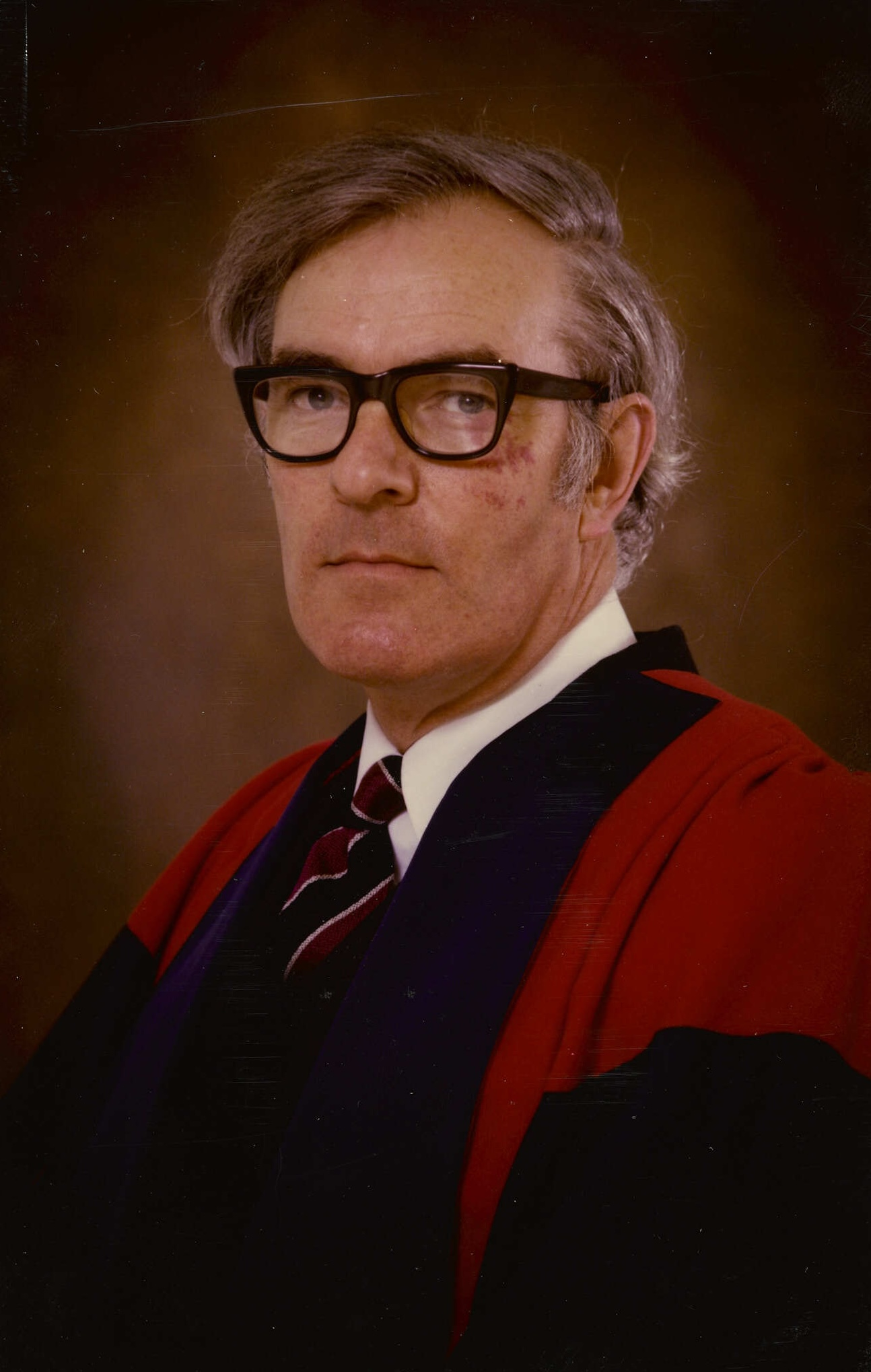
- Petersen in 1981
- Born: George Bouet Petersen; 5 September 1933; Palmerston North, New Zealand
- Died: 11 July 2021 (aged 87); Dunedin, New Zealand
- Education: University of Otago (MSc); University of Oxford (MA, DPhil)
- Spouse: Patricia Jane Egerton Caughey (m. 1960)
- Scientific career
- Fields: Biochemistry
- Institutions: University of Otago
- Doctoral students: Diana Hill; Bill Sutton
- Relatives: George Petersen (father)

George Bouet Petersen ONZM (5 September 1933 – 11 July 2021) was a New Zealand biochemist. He is regarded as the father of DNA research in New Zealand.

== Early life and family ==
Born in Palmerston North on 5 September 1933, Petersen was the son of Elizabeth Stella Osberta Petersen (née Cairns) and George Conrad Petersen. He was educated at Palmerston North Boys' High School, and went on to study at the University of Otago, graduating with a Master of Science with second-class honours in 1956. He then undertook postgraduate study at the University of Oxford, earning Master of Arts and Doctor of Philosophy degrees. A notable doctoral student of Petersen at the University of Otago was Diana Hill.

On 16 April 1960, Petersen married Patricia Jane Egerton Caughey, and the couple went on to have four children.

== Honours and awards ==
Petersen was elected a Fellow of the Royal Society of New Zealand in 1985. He was also a Fellow of the New Zealand Institute of Chemistry. In the 1997 New Year Honours, he was appointed an Officer of the New Zealand Order of Merit, for services to the community. In 2003, Petersen received the Rutherford Medal, the most prestigious award given by the Royal Society of New Zealand.
