= George Petersen (historian) =

New Zealand lawyer, politician and historian (1900–1978)

- Born: George Conrad Petersen; 19 June 1900; Mauriceville West, Wairarapa, New Zealand
- Died: 25 October 1978 (aged 78); Palmerston North, New Zealand
- Occupation(s): Lawyer, local politician and historian
- Children: 1 son and 2 daughters
- Relatives: George Petersen (son)

George Conrad Petersen (19 June 1900 – 25 October 1978) was a New Zealand lawyer, consul, local politician and historian.

== Early life and family ==
Petersen was born in Mauriceville West, Wairarapa, New Zealand in 1900, son of Danish immigrants Jens Peter and Anna Katrina (née Nielsen) Petersen.

At age 17, Jens Peter arrived at Napier on 24 August 1875 on an assisted immigrant on the sailing ship, Friedeburg, as part of PM Sir Julius Vogel's 1870 Public Works and Immigration Scheme to attract Scandinavian settlers to the Manawatu and Wairarapa build the railway, establish farms and to fell the 70 Mile Bush, between Masterton and Napier. Many of the Danes who settled in the Wairarapa were veteran of the Prusso-Danish War of 1864 or refugees from Slesvig. Living amongst these early Scandinavian settlers and listening to their many tales sparked George's life-long interest in history.

He received his education at Mauriceville West School and Masterton District High School. During school, Petersen had boarded with the Cairns family. He trained as a barrister and solicitor under Edward Orr Hurley and was admitted in 1924, then moving to live in Palmerston North.

Petersen married his former Mauriceville West classmate Elizabeth "Stella" Osberta Cairns on 27 December 1926, and they had a daughter, Phyllis Potter born in 1927 and twins George Bouet Petersen and Wendy Cutfield born in 1933.

Stella, a school teacher, died in 1963. Following her death, George married her sister, Coyla Samuella May Foote on 4 September 1965. Coyla, also a school teacher, died in 1974.

== Community contribution ==
George was author of six historical publications, four editor of Who's Who in NZ, PN City Councilor between 1947 and 1950, and received the Coronation Medal in 1953. As a member of the Danish Society in Palmerston North, he raised money for the Danish underground during the Second World War, being awarded the King Christian X's Liberty Medal in 1946. From 1948, he acted as NZ's vice-consul for Denmark, and was appointed consul in 1966. He was New Zealand's liaison person for the second Galathea expedition (Danish Navy's world circumnavigation) for which he was awarded the Danish Galathea Medal in 1952, and for his overall contribution to Denmark was made Knight of the Order of the Dannebrog in 1958, and was promoted to Knight 1st Class in 1968. In 1964 he was awarded an honorary Doctor of Letters, Massey University’s second ever awarded doctorate.

== Selected publications ==
- 1948 William Colenso (with A.G. Bagnall)
- 1952 Pioneering days of Palmerston North
- 1956 Forest Homes
- 1956 The Mair Family (with J.C. Andersen)
- 1966 D.G. Monrad
- 1972 Portraits of New Zealand Maori (with S.M. Mead)
- 1973 Palmerston North, A Centennial History

== Career ==
Petersen was a city councillor for Palmerston North. He edited four editions of the Who's Who in New Zealand.

Of Danish parentage, he was active his whole life for Danish interests. As a member of the Danish Society in Palmerston North, he raised money for the Danish underground, and he was awarded the King Christian X's Liberty Medal in 1946 for his actions. From 1948, he acted as vice-consul for Denmark, and was appointed consul in 1966.

He was the New Zealand liaison person for the second Galathea expedition. For this work, he was awarded the Galathea Medal of Denmark in 1956, and for his overall contribution to Denmark was made Knight of the Order of the Dannebrog in 1958, and was promoted to Knight 1st Class in 1968. He was awarded an honorary Doctor of Letters by Massey University in 1964; this was only the second honorary doctorate awarded by this university.

== Later life ==
Petersen died at Palmerston North on 25 October 1978. Petersen is buried alongside his first wife in a family grave at Kelvin Grove Cemetery in Palmerston North.
