= Alexander Whisker =

Irish New Zealand soldier and diarist

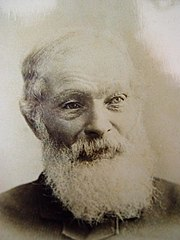
- Born: 1819; Markethill, County Armagh, Ireland
- Died: November 25, 1907 (aged 87–88); King Street, Newmarket, Auckland
- Occupations: Soldier, Diarist
- Spouse: Flora Cook
- Children: Mary Jean, Charles, and others

Alexander Whisker (1819–1907) was an Irish New Zealand soldier and diarist. He was born in Markethill, County Armagh, Ireland in 1819, the son of Catherine Jenkins and her husband James Whisker.

== Military career ==
He enlisted in the British Army on 26 May 1838 and was posted to the 58th (Rutlandshire) Regiment of Foot, where he married Flora Cook, though it is not known when or where the marriage took place. She gave birth to Mary Jean, while the regiment was stationed in Dublin, Ireland on 10 September 1842. Then, she gave birth to Charles on 30 April 1844 at Chatham, while the regiment was awaiting trans-shipment to New South Wales for garrison duties. By March 1845 Whisker and his family were in barracks at Parramatta.

Whisker's stay at Parramatta was short and reinforcements were needed to fight Hōne Heke and Kawiti's forces in New Zealand. No 3 Company of the 58th Regiment arrived in Auckland on 22 April 1845 aboard the Slains Castle en route for the Bay of Islands. The company was commanded by Captain C. W. Thompson, whose soldier-servant was Private Alexander Whisker. During May, Whisker took part in three engagements, including the assault on Heke's Pā at Puketutu and the subsequent retreat. Returning to Auckland, Whisker celebrated his survival in the local grog shops and as a result lost his soldier-servant position with all its privileges.

Whisker remained in Auckland when the company was sent north in May 1845 and missed Colonel Henry Despard's disastrous attack on Heke's pa at Ōhaeawai in June and July. He followed later and visited the battle site and the graves of his comrades at Waimate North. His company joined the force sent against Kawiti's pa at Ruapekapeka in December. Ruapekapeka was taken on 11 January 1846. In the following months, at his camp in Victoria and Wahapu Bay Whisker spent time composing a ballad about the campaigns out of boredom. Eventually, the company returned to Parramatta and Whisker rejoined his family in late December 1846. In New Zealand he had written to Flora and had composed a love poem for her.

== Later life ==
On 10 July 1847 the Whisker family arrived in Auckland on the Pestonjee Bomanjee with a detachment of the 58th. Light duties allowed Alexander Whisker to supplement his pay with casual labour until his discharge on 31 December 1849. The entries in his diary end in April 1852 and are followed by songs and ballads he either composed or copied. He found work as a labourer on Kawau Island and brought property in Newmarket, Auckland. He was convicted for drunkenness in May 1852 and served 24 hours of hard labour. In July of that same year, he was charged with conveying spirituous liquor into jail (prison) and fined. He then worked as a dairyman and then as a contractor. His family eventually numbered six sons and two daughters.

== Death ==
Flora Whisker died on 1 November 1891. Alexander Whisker lived for another 16 years, and died on 25 November 1907 at his home in King Street, Newmarket, Auckland.

== Memorandum book, 1844--1850 ==
During the period after the assault on Heke's Pā at Puketutu, he kept a diary entitled Memorandum book, 1844--1850.
