= Whisker (metallurgy) =

Phenomenon in electrical devices

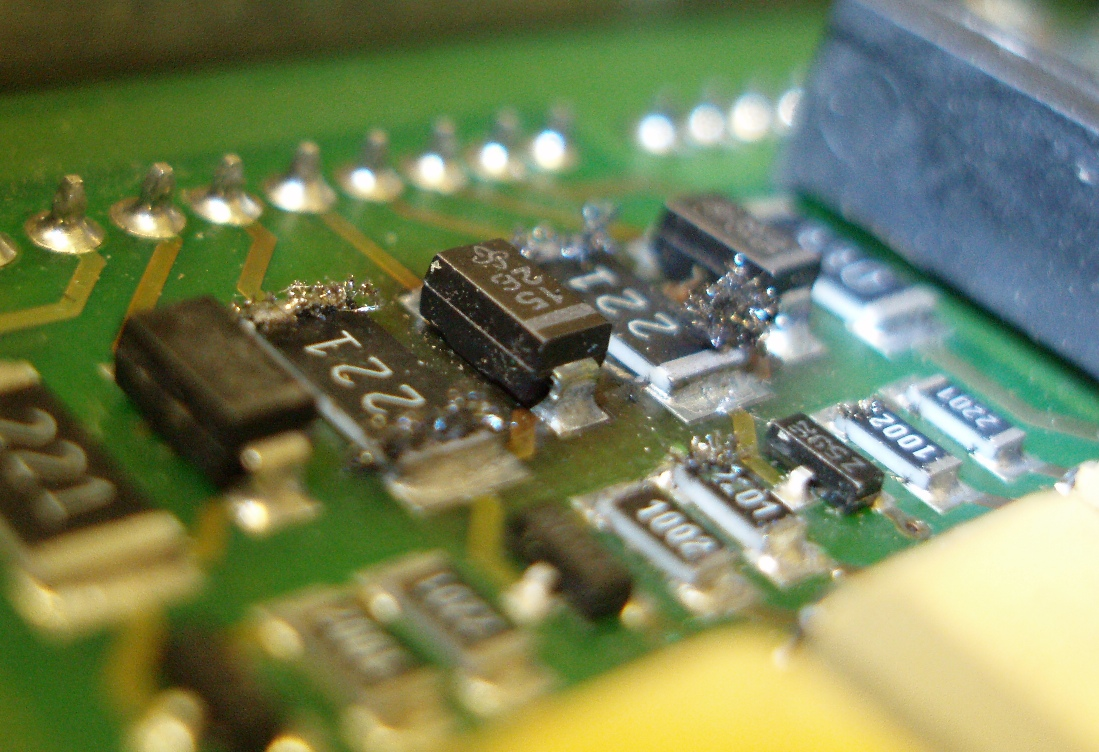
Silver whiskers growing out of surface-mount resistors

Metal whiskering is a phenomenon that occurs in electrical devices when metals form long whisker-like projections over time. Tin whiskers were noticed and documented in the vacuum tube era of electronics early in the 20th century in equipment that used pure, or almost pure, tin solder in their production. It was noticed that small metal hairs or tendrils grew between metal solder pads, causing short circuits. Metal whiskers form in the presence of compressive stress. Germanium, zinc, cadmium, and even lead whiskers have been documented. Many techniques are used to mitigate the problem, including changes to the annealing process (heating and cooling), the addition of elements like copper and nickel, and the inclusion of conformal coatings.

Traditionally, lead has been added to slow down whisker growth in tin-based solders. Following the Restriction of Hazardous Substances Directive (RoHS), the European Union banned the use of lead in most consumer electronic products from 2006 due to health problems associated with lead and the "high-tech trash" problem, leading to a re-focusing on the issue of whisker formation in lead-free solders.

== Mechanism ==
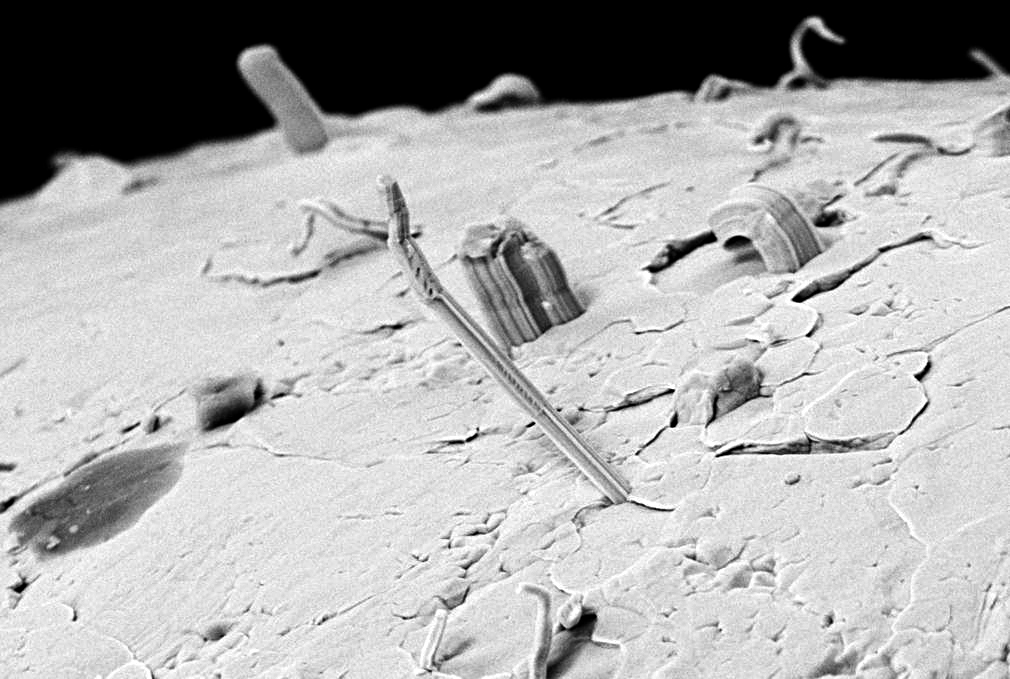
Microscopic view of tin used to solder electronic components, showing a whisker

Metal whiskering is a crystalline metallurgical phenomenon involving the spontaneous growth of tiny, filiform hairs from a metallic surface. The effect is primarily seen on elemental metals but also occurs with alloys.

The mechanism behind metal whisker growth is an unsolved problem in physics, but seems to be encouraged by compressive mechanical stresses including:

- energy gained due to electrostatic polarization of metal filaments in the electric field,
- residual stresses caused by electroplating,
- mechanically induced stresses,
- stresses induced by diffusion of different metals,
- thermally induced stresses, and
- strain gradients in materials.

Metal whiskers differ from metallic dendrites in several respects: dendrites are fern-shaped and grow across the surface of the metal, while metal whiskers are hair-like and project normal to the surface. Dendrite growth requires moisture capable of dissolving the metal into a solution of metal ions, which are then redistributed by electromigration in the presence of an electromagnetic field. While the precise mechanism for whisker formation remains unknown, it is known that whisker formation does not require either dissolution of the metal or the presence of an electromagnetic field.

== Effects ==
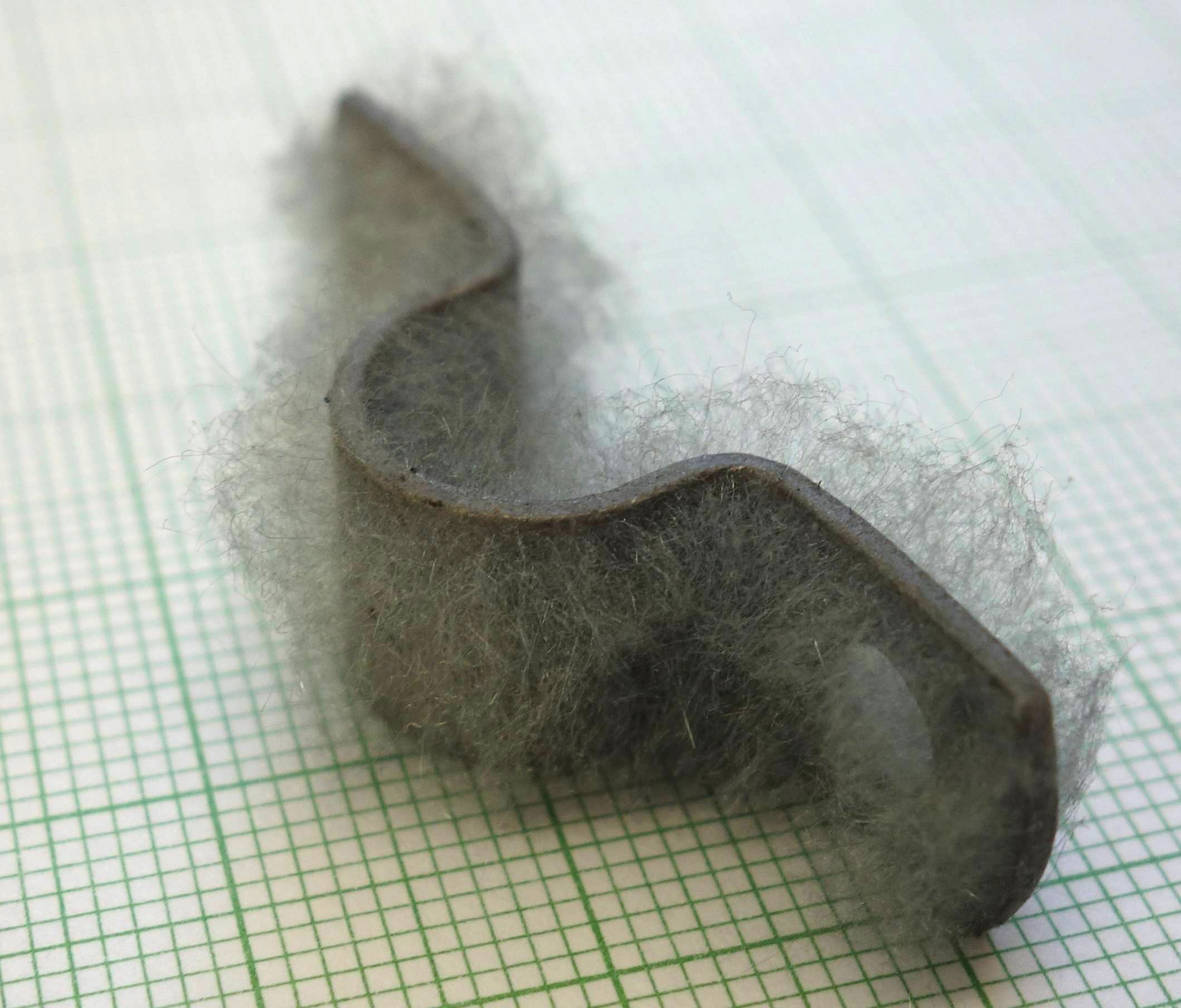
Millimeter-long zinc whiskers on zinc-coated steel

Whiskers can cause short circuits and arcing in electrical equipment. The phenomenon was discovered by telephone companies in the late 1940s and it was later found that the addition of lead to tin solder provided mitigation. The European Restriction of Hazardous Substances Directive (RoHS), which took effect on July 1, 2006, restricted the use of lead in various types of electronic and electrical equipment. This has driven the use of lead-free alloys with a focus on preventing whisker formation. Others have focused on the development of oxygen-barrier coatings to prevent whisker formation.

Airborne zinc whiskers have been responsible for increased system failure rates in computer server rooms. Zinc whiskers grow from galvanized (electroplated) metal surfaces at a rate of up to a millimeter per year with a diameter of a few micrometers. Whiskers can form on the underside of zinc electroplated floor tiles on raised floors. These whiskers can then become airborne within the floor plenum when the tiles are disturbed, usually during maintenance. Whiskers can be small enough to pass through air filters and can settle inside equipment, resulting in short circuits and system failure.

Tin whiskers do not have to be airborne to damage equipment, as they are typically already growing directly in the environment where they can produce short circuits, i.e., the electronic equipment itself. At frequencies above 6 gigahertz or in fast digital circuits, tin whiskers can act like miniature antennas, affecting the circuit impedance and causing reflections. In computer disk drives they can break off and cause head crashes or bearing failures. Tin whiskers often cause failures in relays and have been found upon examination of failed relays in nuclear power facilities. Pacemakers have been recalled due to tin whiskers. Research has also identified a particular failure mode for tin whiskers in vacuum (such as in space), where in high-power components a short-circuiting tin whisker is ionized into a plasma that is capable of conducting hundreds of amperes of current, massively increasing the damaging effect of the short circuit. The possible increase in the use of pure tin in electronics due to the RoHS directive drove the Joint Electron Device Engineering Council (JEDEC) and IPC electronic trade association to release a tin whisker acceptance testing standard and mitigation practices guideline intended to help manufacturers reduce the risk of tin whiskers in lead-free products.

Silver whiskers often appear in conjunction with a layer of silver sulfide, which forms on the surface of silver electrical contacts operating in an atmosphere rich in hydrogen sulfide and high humidity. Such atmospheres can exist in sewage treatment plants and paper mills.

Whiskers over 20 micrometres (μm) in length were observed on gold-plated surfaces and noted in a 2003 NASA internal memorandum.

== Mitigation and elimination ==
Several approaches are used to reduce or eliminate whisker growth, with ongoing research in the area.

=== Conformal coatings ===
Conformal compound coatings stop the whiskers from penetrating a barrier, reaching a nearby termination and forming a short.

=== Altering plating chemistry ===
Termination finishes of nickel, gold or palladium have been shown to eliminate whisker formation in controlled trials.

== Tin whisker examples and incidents ==
=== Galaxy IV ===
Galaxy IV was a telecommunications satellite that was disabled and lost due to short circuits caused by tin whiskers in 1998. It was initially thought that space weather contributed to the failure, but later it was discovered that a conformal coating had been misapplied, allowing whiskers to form in the pure tin plating, find their way through a missing coating area, and cause a failure of the main control computer. The manufacturer, Hughes, has moved to nickel plating, rather than tin, to reduce the risk of whisker growth. The trade-off has been an increase in weight, adding 50 to 100 kilograms (110 to 220 lb) per payload.

=== Millstone Nuclear Power Plant ===
On April 17, 2005, the Millstone Nuclear Power Plant in Connecticut was shut down due to a "false alarm" that indicated an unsafe pressure drop in the reactor's steam system when the steam pressure was actually nominal. The false alarm was caused by a tin whisker that short circuited the logic board responsible for monitoring the steam pressure lines in the power plant.

=== Toyota accelerator position sensors false positive ===
In September 2011, three NASA investigators claimed that they identified tin whiskers on the accelerator position sensors of sampled Toyota Camry models that could contribute to the "stuck accelerator" crashes affecting certain Toyota models during 2005–2010. This contradicted an earlier 10-month joint investigation by the National Highway Traffic Safety Administration (NHTSA) and a large group of other NASA researchers that found no electronic defects.

In 2012, NHTSA maintained: "We do not believe that tin whiskers are a plausible explanation for these incidents...[the likely cause was] pedal misapplication."

Toyota also maintains that tin whiskers were not the cause of any stuck accelerator issues: "In the words of U.S. Transportation Secretary Ray LaHood, 'The verdict is in. There is no electronic-based cause for unintended high-speed acceleration in Toyotas. Period.'" According to a Toyota press release, "no data indicates that tin whiskers are more prone to occur in Toyota vehicles than any other vehicle in the marketplace." Toyota also states that "their systems are designed to reduce the risk that tin whiskers will form in the first place."

== See also ==
- Monocrystalline whisker
- Dendrite (metal)
- Crystal growth
- Gold-aluminium intermetallic
- Impurity
