= Monocrystalline whisker =

High aspect ratio, microscopic, single crystal particles

A monocrystalline whisker is a filament of material that is structured as a single, defect-free crystal. Some typical whisker materials are graphite, alumina, iron, silicon carbide and silicon. Single-crystal whiskers of these (and some other) materials are known for having very high tensile strength (on the order of 10–20 GPa). Whiskers are used in some composites, but large-scale fabrication of defect-free whiskers is very difficult.

Prior to the discovery of carbon nanotubes, single-crystal whiskers had the highest tensile strength of any materials known, and were featured regularly in science fiction as materials for fabrication of space elevators, arcologies, and other large structures. Despite showing great promise for a range of applications, their usage has been hindered by concerns over their effects on health when inhaled.

== See also ==
- Whisker (metallurgy) – Self-organizing metallic whisker-shaped structures that cause problems with electronics.
- Laser-heated pedestal growth
