= Krylov Seamount =

Seamount in the Atlantic Ocean

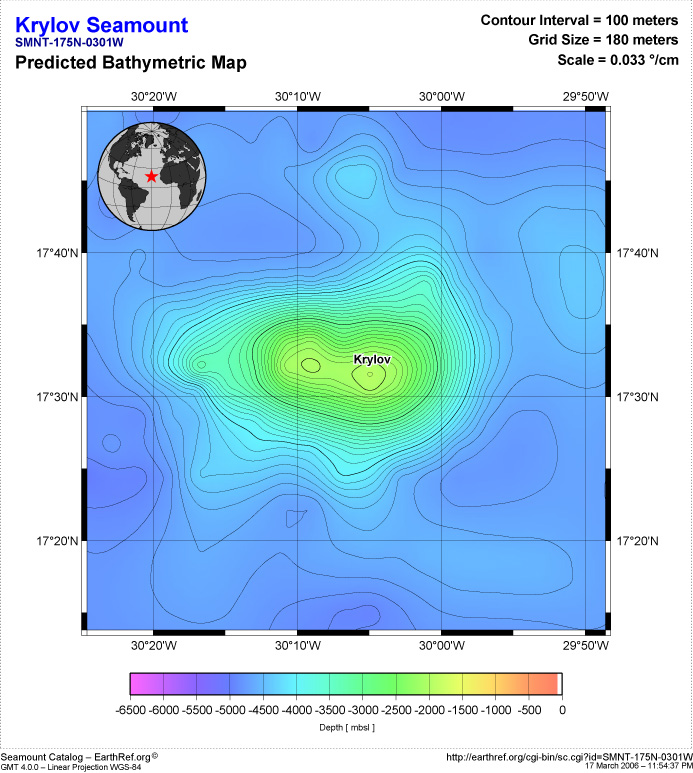

- Location within North Atlantic
- Summit depth: 1,240 metres (4,070 ft)

Location
- Coordinates: 17°31′N 30°07.5′W

Krylov Seamount (also known as Albatross Seamount or Krylou Seamount) is a volcanic seamount in the Atlantic Ocean, west of the Cape Verde islands. It is formed by one seamount and one ridge which are separated by a 5 kilometres (3.1 mi) wide depression, and it rises to a minimum depth of 1,240 metres (4,070 ft); formerly the depression was interpreted to be a caldera. The seamount probably formed no later than 70-75 million years ago before sinking to its current depth.

== History and name ==
The seamount was discovered in 1981 by a Russian research ship and named after the Russian naval engineer and mathematician Aleksey Krylov.

== Geography and geomorphology ==
Krylov Seamount lies 300 kilometres (190 mi) west of the Cape Verde islands in the Cape Verde Basin of the East Atlantic, at a water depth of 4,600–4,700 metres (15,100–15,400 ft); the highest point lies at 1,270 metres (4,170 ft) and the seamount rises about 3,200 metres (10,500 ft) above the seafloor. It is an elongated volcano that consists of an eastern summit at about 1,240 metres (4,070 ft) depth ("Krylov Seamount" proper), separated from a 15–20 kilometres (9.3–12.4 mi) western ridge ("Krylov Ridge") by a 5 kilometres (3.1 mi) wide depression. Formerly, the whole seamount was interpreted to be an apparently volcanic breccia-filled summit caldera plus three separate summits sharing a common pedestal at 2,500–2,600 metres (8,200–8,500 ft) depth. The terrain of the seamount is covered by organic debris, which with depth gives way to pillow lavas; marine sediments cover much of the outer slopes of the seamount. The seafloor under Krylov is about 95 million years old.

== Geology and geochronology ==
The seamount was probably formed by a mantle diapir with eruptions occurring along fissures and in association with the Mid-Atlantic Ridge. It probably began to form no less than 70-75 million years ago, as reefs of that age containing coccoliths, corals and foraminifers have been found on the seamount; they also indicate that the seamount was emergent at that time. The seamount may have risen between 1,100–2,000 metres (3,600–6,600 ft) above sea level before thermal subsidence lowered it to its current depth. Corals, golden corals, sea stars and sponges have been found at Krylov Seamount.

== Composition ==
Compositionally, the seamount is formed by alkali basalts and hydrothermally altered basalts containing palagonite and plagioclase with additional clay, hyaloclastite and palygorskite; additionally it features biogenic limestone, carbonate sands, carbonate sandstone, corals, foraminifera sands, iron-manganese crusts, muddy sands, sands, shelly debris and volcanic breccia. The volcanic rocks display some geochemical differences between the western ridge and the eastern summit.

These iron-manganese crusts can be as much as 10 centimetres (3.9 in) thick. Vernadite is among the most important components of the iron-manganese crusts, followed by manganese-containing feroxyhyte; additional components are apatite, asbolane, birnessite, buserite, goethite, mica smectite, smectite, palygorskite, quartz, todorokite and zeolites. The formation of the iron-manganese crusts was influenced by hydrothermal activity, when Krylov Seamount was close to the Mid-Atlantic Ridge about 97 million years ago (Cenomanian).
