= Researcher Ridge =

Underwater ridge in Northern Atlantic Ocean

- Location within North Atlantic

Location
- Location: Northern Atlantic Ocean
- Coordinates: 15°N 50°W

Researcher Ridge is an underwater ridge in the Northern Atlantic Ocean. It appears to be a chain of seamounts named Gollum Seamount, Vayda Seamount, Bilbo Seamount, Gandalf Seamount, The Shire Seamount, Pippin Seamount, Merry Seamount, Molodezhnaya Seamount, Frodo Seamount, Sam Seamount and Mount Doom Seamount that were likely formed by a hotspot.

== Names ==
In 1974, the United States Board on Geographic Names formally approved the name Researcher Ridge in honor of NOAAS Researcher, a National Oceanic and Atmospheric Administration oceanographic research ship which discovered the ridge in 1971. Vayda Seamount is named after a Russian research vessel, Vayda, and the name of Molodezhnaya (Russian for "Youth") Seamount refers to young scientists aboard Vayda. The ridge's other seamounts are named after characters and locations in the fantasy novel The Lord of the Rings.

== Geography and geomorphology ==
Researcher Ridge lies in the Atlantic Ocean on the western side of the Mid-Atlantic Ridge, just south of the Fifteen-Twenty fracture zone. The Mid-Atlantic Ridge lies about 300 kilometres (162 nmi; 186 mi) east of Researcher Ridge.

The ridge is a chain of individual seamounts. It is about 400 kilometres (216 nmi; 249 mi) long with an east-southeast-to-west-northwest strike and its minimum depth decreases eastward to 800 metres (2,625 ft), concordant with mean water depth. The individual seamounts that make up the ridge are, from east to west, Gollum Seamount, Vayda Seamount, Bilbo Seamount, Gandalf Seamount, The Shire Seamount, Pippin Seamount, Merry Seamount, Molodezhnaya Seamount, Frodo Seamount, Sam Seamount, and Mount Doom Seamount. Small cones occur on the surface of Vayda Seamount, which rises to a depth of about 400 metres (1,312 ft) below sea level; many of these seamounts appear to be guyots. Only Bilbo Seamount and Vayda Seamount show clear evidence of once having been emerged islands.

== Geology ==
A number of explanations have been forwarded to explain the existence of this ridge, from hotspots fed by a mantle plume over the presence of enriched mantle to the activity of the triple junction between Africa, North America, and South America. A hotspot origin is considered to be the most likely explanation; according to this theory a mantle plume built Researcher Ridge until the hotspot was "captured" by the Mid-Atlantic Ridge. A well-known section of the Mid-Atlantic Ridge that has erupted enriched rocks lies between 14 and 15 degrees North and also features the Logatchev hydrothermal field.

The oceanic crust underlying Researcher Ridge has an age ranging between 20 million and 40 million years, increasing westwards. An en echelon graben named Researcher Trough lies north of Researcher Ridge.

=== Composition ===
Rock samples obtained from the seamounts have yielded basaltic cobbles, manganese crusts, reefal limestone and scoria, as well as foraminifera sand, hyaloclastite and palagonite. Volcanic rocks sampled at two seamounts contain phenocrysts of clinopyroxene, olivine, and plagioclase, and further contain calcite, clay, iddingsite, and pyroxene. Aside from one rhyolite they are classified as an ocean island basalt suite with alkali basalt and tholeiite components.

== Biology ==
Corals, crustaceans, golden corals, hydrozoans, seastars and silica sponges have been found on Researcher Ridge.

== Eruption history ==
Most seamounts are probably about as old as the seafloor underlying them, but argon-argon dating on Frodo Seamount has yielded an age of 28.75 ± 0.14 million years and a more questionable age of 3.44 ± 0.77 million years ago has been obtained on Molodezhnaya Seamount that may reflect rejuvenated volcanism. Fresh lava flows sampled from Molodezhnaya Seamount and earthquakes recorded along the ridge suggest that volcanic activity may still be ongoing.

== See also ==
- Krylov Seamount
- Rocket Seamount
- Tropic Seamount
