= Inner sphere =

Inner Sphere may refer to:

- Inner sphere complex, a type of ion-surface binding
- Inner sphere electron transfer, a chemical reaction involving closely associated atoms
- Inner Sphere (BattleTech), the primary setting of the BattleTech universe
