= Manganese nodule =

Mineral concretion found on the sea bottom

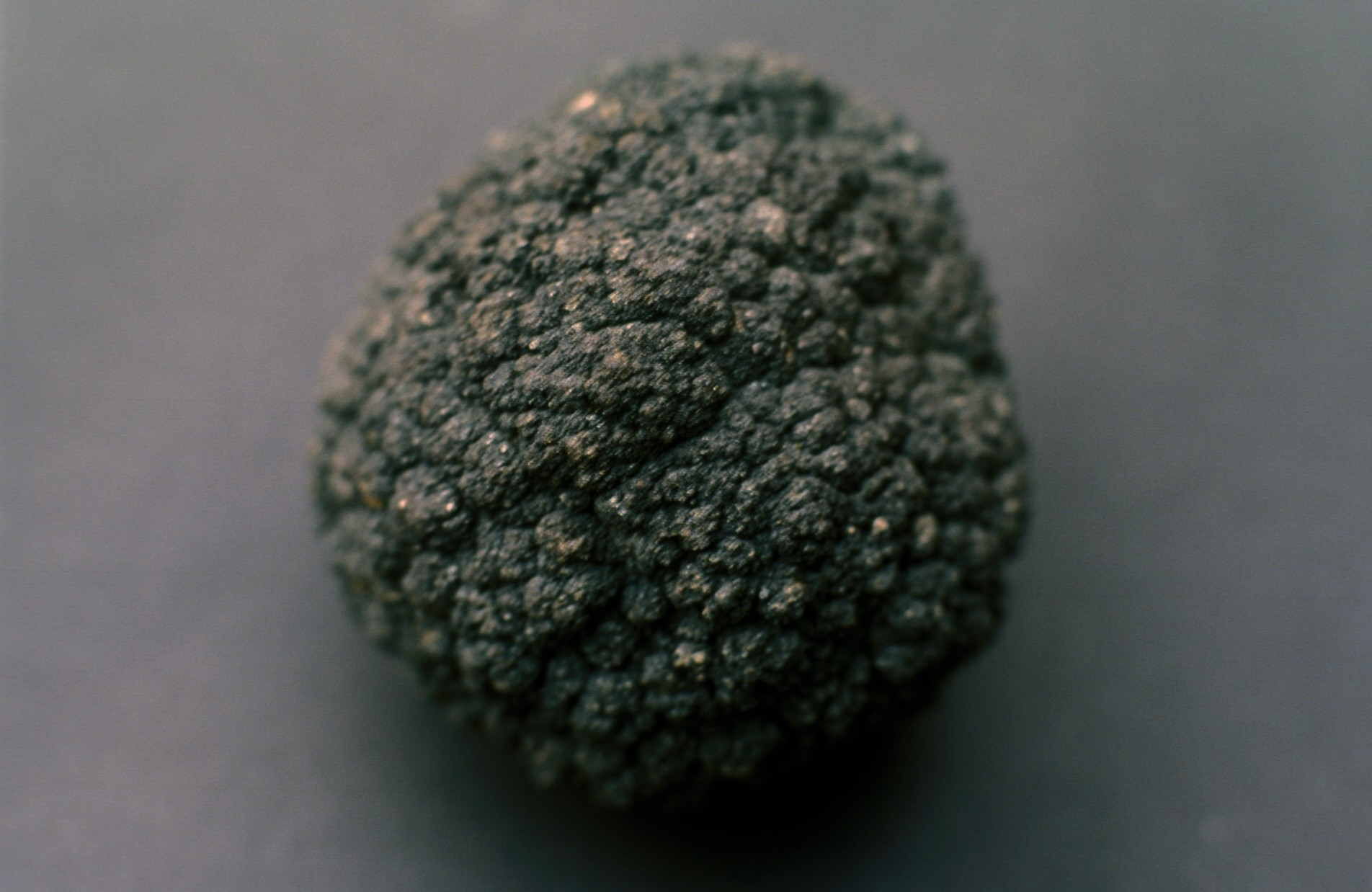
Manganese nodule

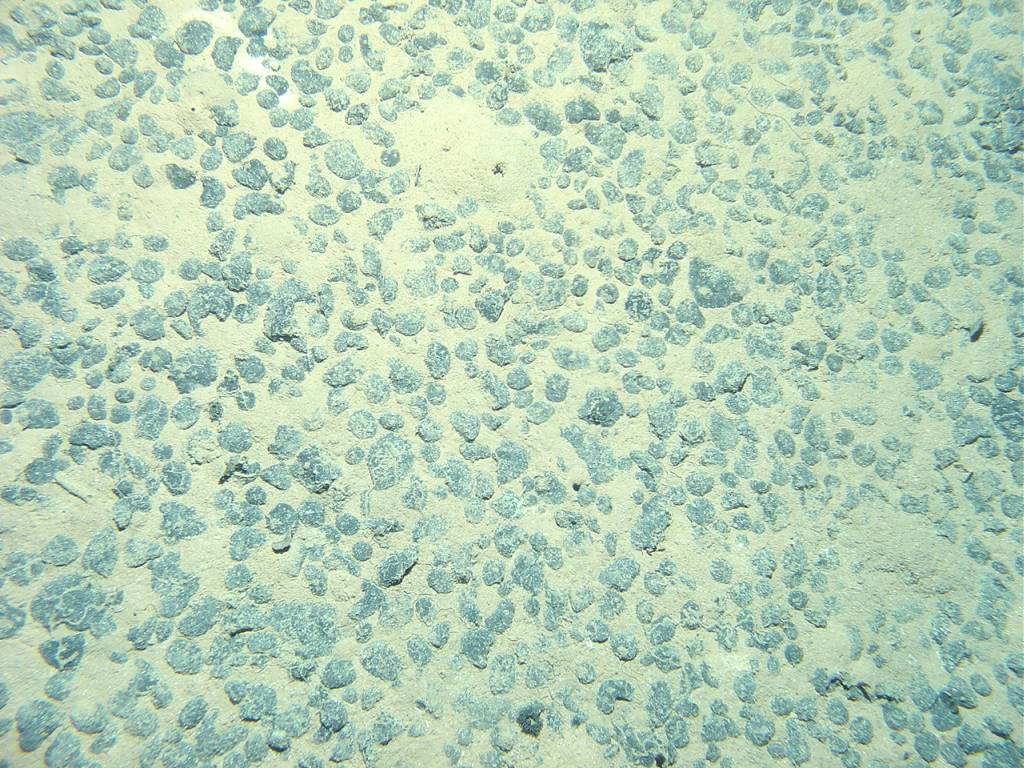
Nodules on the seabed

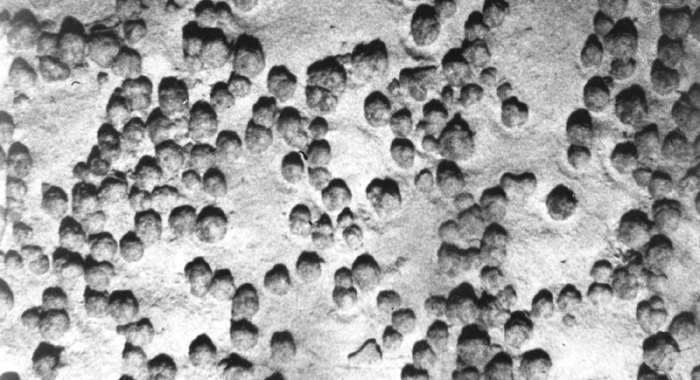
Ferromanganese nodules found on the seafloor

Manganese nodules, also called polymetallic nodules, are mineral concretions on the sea bottom formed of concentric layers of iron and manganese hydroxides around a core. As nodules can be found in vast quantities, and contain valuable metals, deposits have been identified as a potential economic interest. Depending on their composition and authorial choice, they may also be called ferromanganese nodules. Ferromanganese nodules are mineral concretions composed of silicates and insoluble iron and manganese oxides that form on the ocean seafloor and terrestrial soils. The formation mechanism involves a series of redox oscillations driven by both abiotic and biotic processes. As a byproduct of pedogenesis, the specific composition of a ferromanganese nodule depends on the composition of the surrounding soil. The formation mechanisms and composition of the nodules allow for couplings with biogeochemical cycles beyond iron and manganese. The high relative abundance of nickel, copper, manganese, and other rare metals in nodules has increased interest in their use as a mining resource.

Nodules vary in size from tiny particles visible only under a microscope to large pellets more than 20 centimetres (8 in) across. However, most nodules are between 3 and 10 cm (1 and 4 in) in diameter, about the size of hen's eggs. Their surface textures vary from smooth to rough. They frequently have botryoidal (mammillated or knobby) texture and vary from spherical in shape to typically oblate, sometimes prolate, or are otherwise irregular. The bottom surface, buried in sediment, is generally rougher than the top due to a different type of growth.

== Occurrence ==
Nodules lie on the seabed sediment, often partly or completely buried. They vary greatly in abundance, in some cases touching one another and covering more than 70% of the sea floor surface. The total amount of polymetallic nodules on the sea floor was estimated at 500 billion tons by Alan A. Archer of the London Geological Museum in 1981.

Polymetallic nodules are found in both shallow (e.g. the Baltic Sea) and deeper waters (e.g. the central Pacific), even in lakes, and are thought to have been a feature of the seas and oceans at least since the deep oceans were oxygenated in the Ediacaran period over 540 million years ago.

Polymetallic nodules were discovered in 1868 in the Kara Sea, in the Arctic Ocean of Siberia. During the scientific expeditions of HMS Challenger (1872–1876), they were found to occur in most oceans of the world.

Their composition varies by location, and sizeable deposits have been found in the following areas:

- Penrhyn Basin within the Cook Islands.
- North central Pacific Ocean in a region called the Clarion–Clipperton zone (CCZ) roughly midway between Hawaii and Clipperton Islands.
- Peru Basin in the southeast Pacific, and
- Southern tropical Indian Ocean in a region termed the Indian Ocean Nodule Field (IONF) roughly 500 km SE of Diego Garcia Island.
- In the Eastern Pacific, including the area around Juan Fernández Islands and the abyssal plain offshore Loa River.

The largest of these deposits in terms of nodule abundance and metal concentration occur in the Clarion–Clipperton zone on vast abyssal plains in the deep ocean between 4,000 and 6,000 m (13,000 and 20,000 ft).

All of these deposits are in international waters apart from the Penrhyn Basin, which lies within the exclusive economic zone of the Cook Islands.

== Growth and composition ==
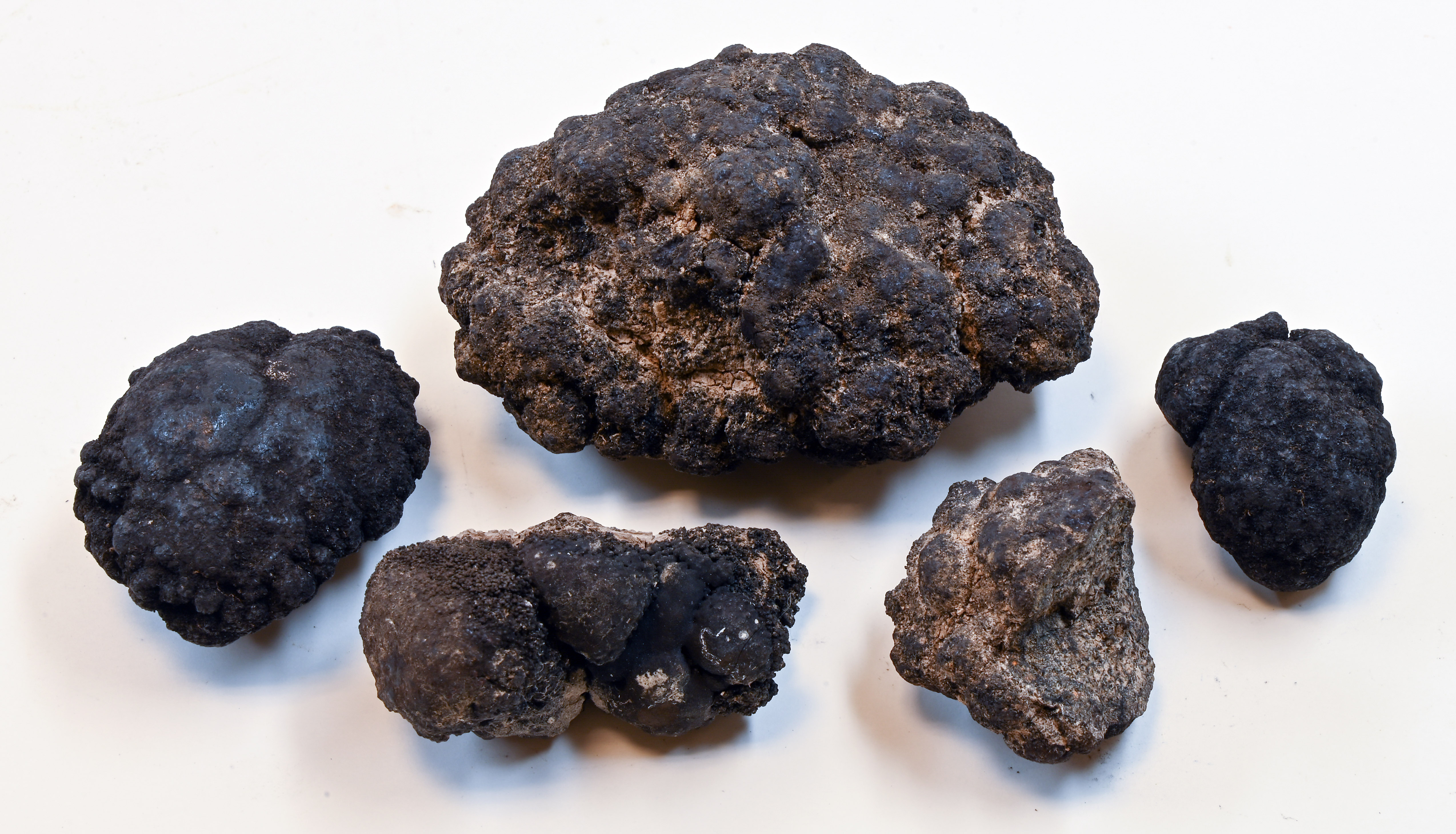
Manganese nodules from the South Pacific Ocean

In both marine and terrestrial environments, ferromanganese nodules are composed primarily of iron and manganese oxide concretions supported by an aluminosilicate matrix and surrounding a nucleus. Typically terrestrial nodules are more enriched in iron, while marine nodules tend to have higher manganese to iron ratios, depending on the formation mechanism and surrounding sedimentary composition. Regardless of where they form, the nodules are characterized by enrichment in iron, manganese, heavy metals, and rare earth element content when compared to the Earth's crust and surrounding sediment. However, organically-bound elements in the surrounding environment are not readily incorporated into nodules.

=== Marine nodules ===
On the seabed the abundance of nodules varies and is likely controlled by the thickness and stability of a geochemically active layer that forms at the seabed. Pelagic sediment type and seabed bathymetry (or geomorphology) likely influence the characteristics of the geochemically active layer.

Nodule growth is one of the slowest of all known geological phenomena, on the order of a centimeter over several million years. Several processes are hypothesized to be involved in the formation of nodules, including the precipitation of metals from seawater, the remobilization of manganese in the water column (diagenetic), the derivation of metals from hot springs associated with volcanic activity (hydrothermal), the decomposition of basaltic debris by seawater and the precipitation of metal hydroxides through the activity of microorganisms (biogenic). The sorption of divalent cations such as Mn^{2+}, Fe^{2+}, Co^{2+}, Ni^{2+}, and Cu^{2+} at the surface of Mn^{−} and Fe-oxyhydroxides, known to be strong sorbents, also plays a main role in the accumulation of these transition metals in the manganese nodules. These processes (precipitation, sorption, surface complexation, surface precipitation, incorporation by formation of solid solutions...) may operate concurrently or they may follow one another during the formation of a nodule.

Manganese nodules are essentially composed of hydrated phyllomanganates. These are layered Mn-oxide minerals with interlayers containing water molecules in variable quantities. They strongly interact with trace metals (Co^{2+}, Ni^{2+}) because of the octahedral vacancies present in their layers. The particular properties of phyllomanganates explain the role they play in many geochemical concentration processes. They incorporate traces of transition metals mainly via cation exchange in their interlayer like clay minerals and surface complexation by formation of inner sphere complexes at the oxide surface as it is also the case with hydrous ferric oxides, HFO. Slight variations in their crystallographic structure and mineralogical composition may result in considerable changes in their chemical reactivity.

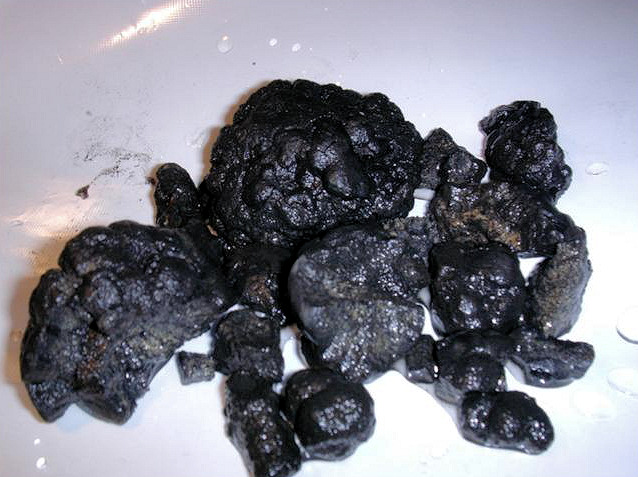
Polymetallic nodules

The mineral composition of manganese-bearing minerals is dependent on how the nodules are formed; sedimentary nodules, which have a lower Mn^{2+} content than diagenetic, are dominated by Fe-vernadite, Mn-feroxyhyte, and asbolane-buserite while diagenetic nodules are dominated by buserite I, birnessite, todorokite, and asbolane-buserite. The growth types termed diagenetic and hydrogenetic reflect suboxic and oxic growth, which in turn could relate to periods of interglacial and glacial climate. It has been estimated that suboxic-diagenetic type 2 layers make up about 50–60% of the chemical inventory of the nodules from the Clarion–Clipperton zone (CCZ) whereas oxic-hydrogenetic type 1 layers comprise about 35–40%. The remaining part (5–10%) of the nodules consists of incorporated sediment particles occurring along cracks and pores.

The chemical composition of nodules varies according to the type of manganese minerals and the size and characteristics of their core. Those of greatest economic interest contain manganese (27–30 wt. %), nickel (1.25–1.5 wt. %), copper (1–1.4 wt. %) and cobalt (0.2–0.25 wt. %). Other constituents include iron (6 wt. %), silicon (5 wt. %) and aluminium (3 wt. %), with lesser amounts of calcium, sodium, magnesium, potassium, titanium and barium, along with hydrogen and oxygen as well as water of crystallization and free water. In a given manganese nodule, there is one part of iron oxide for every two parts of manganese dioxide.

A wide range of trace elements and trace minerals are found in nodules with many of these incorporated from the seabed sediment, which itself includes particles carried as dust from all over the planet before settling to the seabed.

The size of marine ferromanganese nodules can range from a diameter of 1–15 cm, surrounding a nucleus. The nucleus itself can be made from a variety of small objects in the surrounding environment, including fragments from previously broken down nodules, rock fragments, or sunken biogenic matter. Total nodule composition varies based on the formation mechanism, broadly broken down into two major categories: hydrogenetic and diagenetic. Hydrogenetic nodules have a higher iron and cobalt enrichment with manganese to iron ratios less than 2.5, while diagenetic nodules are more enriched with manganese, nickel, and copper with manganese to iron ratios typically between 2.5 and 5 but upwards to 30+ in sub-oxic conditions. The parent mineral for hydrogenetic nodules is vernadite and buserite for diagenetic nodules. The majority of observed nodules are a mixture of hydrogenetic and diagenetic regions of growth, preserving the changes in formation mechanisms over time. Generally, diagenetic layers are found on the bottom where the nodule is either buried in or touching the sea floor sediment and hydrogenetic layers are found towards the top where it is exposed to the overlying water column. Nodule layers are discontinuous and vary in thickness on micro to nanometer scale with those composed of higher manganese content typically brighter and those with higher iron content dark and dull.

=== Terrestrial nodules ===
Terrestrial ferromanganese nodules form in a variety of soil types, including but not limited to ultisols, vertisols, inceptisols, alfisols, and mollisols. Similar to the marine nodules, concretion layers are defined based on iron and manganese content as well as their combination. High iron content nodules appear a red or brown color, while high manganese content appears black or grey. The dominant metal oxide is related to the elements enriched in the nodule. In manganese-dominated nodules, enriched elements include barium, strontium, nickel, cobalt, copper, cadmium, lead, and zinc. In contrast, iron-dominated nodules are enriched in vanadium, phosphorus, arsenic, and chromium.

== Formation ==
=== Marine origin ===
Marine ferromanganese nodules form from the precipitation of primarily iron, manganese, nickel, copper, cobalt, and zinc around an initial nucleus. The mechanism is defined based on the source of the precipitation. Precipitation sourced from the above water column is referred to as hydrogenetic, while precipitation from the sediment pore water is diagenetic. Nodule growth occurs more readily in oxygenated environments with relatively low sedimentation rates that provide adequate levels of labile organic matter to fuel precipitation. When sedimentation rates are too high, nodules can be completely covered in sediments, lowering the local oxygen levels and preventing precipitation. Growth rates for nodules are a current topic for research complicated by the irregular and discontinuous nature of their formation, but average rates have been calculated using radiometric dating. In general hydrogenetic nodules grow slower than diagenetic at approximately 2–5 mm per million years versus 10 mm per million years. The formation of polynodules from multiple nodules growing together is possible and hypothesized to be facilitated by deposited encrusting organisms.

=== Terrestrial origin ===
Formation of terrestrial ferromanganese nodules involves the accumulation of iron and manganese oxides followed by repeated redox cycles of reductive dissolution and oxidative precipitation. The oscillating redox cycle is controlled by pH, microbial activity, organic matter concentration, groundwater level, soil saturation, and redox potential. Anthropogenic activity could influence these cycles through increased nutrient loading via fertilizers. Assessment of the changing paleoclimate conditions during soil evolution can be explored by analyzing the nodule's concretion structure when combined with dating techniques. Manganese layers typically form at higher redox potentials compared to iron layers, but a period of rapid increase in redox potential can form a mixed layer. As the nodules are formed, trace elements including but not limited to nickel, cobalt, copper, and zinc are incorporated. Trace metals composition is a product of three processes: uptake of parent material in surrounding soil, accumulation of the products of microbial iron or manganese-reducing bacteria, and complexation on the nodule's surface.

== Proposed mining – history of mining activities ==
Interest in the potential exploitation of polymetallic nodules generated a great deal of activity among prospective mining consortia in the 1960s and 1970s. Almost half a billion dollars was invested in identifying potential deposits and in research and development of technology for mining and processing nodules. These studies were carried out by four multinational consortia composed of companies from the United States, Canada, the United Kingdom, West Germany, Belgium, the Netherlands, Italy, Japan, and two groups of private companies and agencies from France and Japan. There were also three publicly sponsored entities from the Soviet Union, India and China.

In the late 1970s, two of the international joint ventures collected several hundred-ton quantities of manganese nodules from the abyssal plains (18,000 feet (5.5 km) + depth) of the eastern equatorial Pacific Ocean. Significant quantities of nickel (the primary target) as well as copper and cobalt were subsequently extracted from this "ore" using both pyrometallurgical and hydrometallurgical methods. In the course of these projects, a number of ancillary developments evolved, including the use of near-bottom towed side-scan sonar array to assay the nodule population density on the abyssal silt while simultaneously performing a sub-bottom profile with a derived, vertically oriented, low-frequency acoustic beam. Since then, deep sea technology has improved significantly: including widespread and low cost use of navigation technology such as Global Positioning System (GPS) and ultra-short baseline (USBL); survey technology such as multibeam echosounder (MBES) and autonomous underwater vehicles (AUV); and intervention technology including remotely operated underwater vehicle (ROV) and high power umbilical cables. There is also improved technology that could be used in mining including pumps, tracked and screw drive rovers, rigid and flexible drilling risers, and ultra-high-molecular-weight polyethylene rope. Mining is considered to be similar to the potato harvest on land, which involves mining a field partitioned into long, narrow strips. The mining support vessel follows the mining route of the seafloor mining tools, picking up the about potato-sized nodules from the seafloor.

In the 2010s, increased demand for nickel and other metals prompted commercial interest in seabed nodules. The International Seabed Authority has granted new exploration contracts and is progressing development of a mining code for the area, with most interest being in the Clarion–Clipperton zone.

Since 2011, a number of commercial companies have received exploration contracts. These include subsidiaries of larger companies including Lockheed Martin, DEME (Global Sea Mineral Resources, GSR), Keppel Corporation, The Metals Company, and China Minmetals, and smaller companies like Nauru Ocean Resources, Tonga Offshore Mining and Marawa Research and Exploration.

In July 2021, Nauru announced a plan to exploit nodules in this area, which requires the International Seabed Authority, which regulates mining in international waters, to finalize mining regulations by July 2023. Environmentalists have criticized this move on the grounds that too little is known about seabed ecosystems to understand the potential impacts of deep-sea mining, and some of the major tech companies, including Samsung and BMW, have committed to avoid using metals derived from nodules.

=== Proposed mining areas of manganese nodules ===
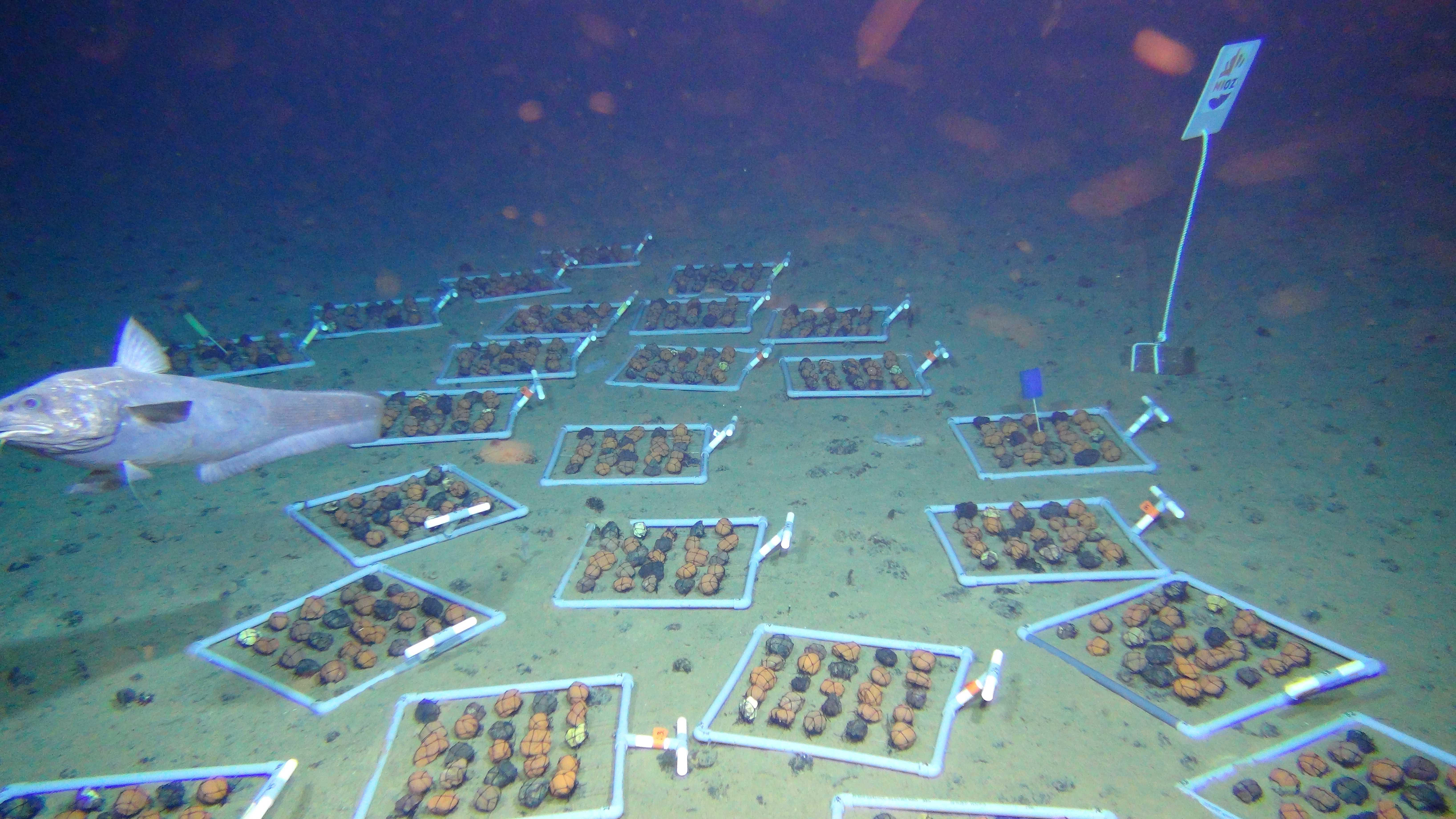
Research into manganese nodules in the Clarion–Clipperton zone

The Clarion–Clipperton zone serves as the largest and most popular area for mining manganese nodules. Extending from approximately 120W to 160W, the Clarion–Clipperton zone can be located in the Pacific Ocean, lying between Hawaii and Mexico. According to the ISA, it covers an area of about four million square kilometers which almost equals the size of the European Union. The huge potential of the Clarion–Clipperton zone is based on an estimated amount of 21 billion tons of nodules. Around 44 million tons of cobalt are stored in that area alone, which is around three times more than the land reserves could provide. Manganese nodule fields are not equally distributed on the seafloor within the Clarion–Clipperton zone but rather occur in patches. Economically interesting patches with a high distribution of manganese nodules can cover an area of several thousand square kilometers. This rather irregular nodule distribution in the South Pacific can be found as a possible result of the greater topographic and sedimentological diversity of the South Pacific.

=== The economic interest of mining manganese nodules ===
The high natural abundance of nickel, copper, cobalt, zinc, iron, and manganese in ferromanganese nodules has promoted research into their use as a rare metal resource. The Clarion–Clipperton zone in the northeastern Pacific Ocean has been observed as an area containing the highest concentration of resource-grade nodules. A bulk weight greater than 3% for nickel, copper, and cobalt is required to be considered resource-grade. Nodule formation in oxic waters at or below the carbonate compensation depth produces the most desirable rare metal ratio in hydrogenic nodules. As the grade of ores from terrestrial mines has decreased over time, ferromanganese nodules may offer a way to meet the growing global demand for rare metals. However, the low estimated growth rate of hydrogenic nodules of about 2–5 mm per million years categorizes them as a non-renewable resource.

Technologies like electric car batteries, wind turbines and solar panels require rare types of resources that can be found in the seabed. Manganese nodules provide various sources of these metals, especially cobalt. The ongoing digitalization, transport and energy transition causes a rising demand for metals such as copper, nickel cobalt and many other metals used in technology. Manganese nodules are therefore needed for batteries, laptops, and smartphones, in e-bikes and e-cars, solar and wind turbines as well as for the storage of green electricity. This enormous demand in cobalt sets the ocean into a new light — many countries have already staked their claims. Yet at the same time, mining them might cause even greater damages to the deep-sea ecosystem. Some scientists question the prime economical interest in manganese nodules. As far as they are concerned, such biological resources could be an untapped value for biotechnologies and medicines and should therefore be protected at all cost.

== Ecology ==
Ferromanganese nodules are highly redox active, allowing for interaction with biogeochemical cycles primarily as an electron acceptor. Notably, terrestrial nodules uptake and trap nitrogen, phosphorus, and organic carbon. The higher rate of organic carbon uptake allows nodules to enhance a soil's ability to sequester carbon, creating a net sink. Phosphorus concentration in the nodules ranges from 2.5 to 7 times the value of the surrounding soil matrix. Microbes in the soil can utilize the nutrient enrichment on the surface of nodules coupled with their redox potential to fuel their metabolic pathways and release the once immobile phosphorus. Along with nutrients, ferromanganese nodules can sequester toxic heavy metals (lead, copper, zinc, cobalt, nickel, and cadmium) from the soil, improving its quality. However, similar to the release of phosphorus by microbes, reductive dissolution of the nodules would release these heavy metals back into the soil.

== Environmental impacts of mining manganese nodules ==
Very little is known about deep sea ecosystems or the potential impacts of deep-sea mining. Polymetallic nodule fields are hotspots of abundance and diversity for a highly vulnerable abyssal fauna, much of which lives attached to nodules or in the sediment immediately beneath it. Nodule mining could affect tens of thousands of square kilometers of these deep sea ecosystems, and ecosystems take millions of years to recover. It causes habitat alteration, direct mortality of benthic creatures, or smothering of filter feeders by sediment. Due to the complexity and remoteness of the deep-sea, environmental scientists work in a knowledge poor situation with many gaps and high uncertainty. Nevertheless, there are several sources of cumulative impacts caused within a mining operation that must be considered. These impacts can be directly caused by the mining activities themselves but also occur as indirect impacts such as sedimentation plumes and disposition. Multiple impacts can be caused from the same mining activity but affect the deep-sea environment in different ways.

These could include:

- discharge plumes that have effects of clogging feeding mechanisms of plankton
- Noise and light pollution that cause reduced visibility for predators
- Ecotoxicological or chemical temperature changes in the water quality

=== Destruction of seabed and habitat ===
The dump-truck-sized collection vehicles that scour the seafloor for nodule-bearing sediment, do necessarily destroy the top of the seabed – at a depth of often more than three kilometers below the surface. Scientists found that collection vehicles can have long-lasting physical and biological effects on the seafloor and cause an altering of various deep-sea ecosystems that scientists are still working to understand. This mining method leads to an inevitable loss of life among animals while the plow tracks remained visible decades later. Recent growth estimates suggest that "microbially mediated biogeochemical functions" need over 50 years to return to their undisturbed initial state. The DISCOL impact study aimed to reveal the potential long-term impacts of deep-sea mining-related disturbances on seafloor integrity by revisiting 26-year-old plough tracks. While nodules appeared outside the tracks dusted with sediments, the plough tracks themselves were clearly devoid of nodules.

The contracts to explore for manganese nodules are typically for areas up to 75,000 square kilometres (29,000 sq mi), but the total area affected by the extractions is much greater. The extent of physically disturbed seabed area in one mine contract area only can be assumed to be between 200 and 600 square kilometres (77 and 232 mi^{2}) each year, which equals the size of a large town.

=== Sediment laden plumes ===
The mining robots operating on the seabed floor emit plumes of sediment, which could cover fauna in the area around the mining site and therefore have a great impact on the ecosystem of the seabed. The produced plumes contain a mixture of dissolved material and suspended particles of a range of sizes. Dissolved material is transported inextricably by the water that contains it, whereas suspended particles tend to sink. The contained area can be estimated much bigger than the actual mined area, since finer particles and dissolved material will be transported greater distances away from the actual mined area. Seabed accumulations of plume material will therefore be thicker and contain larger particles close to the source of the plume.

In addition to the plumes created by mining activities on the seabed, discharge plumes should also be considered, that will be created by the return of excess water. Excess water occurs during the dewatering process on board of the surface vessel as well as when ore slurries are transported from the mothership to the transport barges. Predictions of the net impact of plumes should therefore consider a range of scenarios. A lot of unknowns remain, scientists warn that there might be toxic impacts.

=== Noise pollution ===
Human-generated sound can cause direct damage to marine animals, as many of them use sound as their primary mode of communication. The extreme background noise caused by the mining machines can interfere with the communication between animals and limit their ability to detect prey. Furthermore, noise and vibration can affect auditory senses and systems of marine animals. Noise can be caused during different processes of deep-sea mining:

- noise and vibration from seabed production tools
- midwater plumes used to transfer ores to the surface ship
- the surface ship itself

The surface vessel produces several high intensities sounds for example caused by the propellers, engines, generators, and hydraulic pumps. It is also important to consider the fact that the ship will operate almost continuously for many years during the mining contract which usually lasts for 20–30 years.

=== Light pollution ===
Mining activities could impair the feeding and reproduction of deep-sea species through the creation of intense noise and light pollution in a naturally dark and silent environment. Light pollution is another important factor that causes environmental impacts on sea life. The light that is used to make mining work undersea possible could attract or repel some animal species, bright lights can also blind certain marine animals. Strong lights used at the vessel and ships can influence birds as well as near surface animals.

== Mitigation of environmental impacts ==
There is still a gap in research of how to reduce these environmental impacts. This is partly because the entire ocean ecosystem still needs to be discovered and researched much more. Some scientists suggest that one possibility would be to reduce the weight of mining vehicles. This could reduce compaction and lessen the amount of disturbed sediment at the rear of the vehicle. Since many deep seas are extremely dependent on the hard substrate of manganese nodules in their food chain, another option would be to leave at least a few tracks of nodules left and to not harvest them. Due to the extremely long growth rate, the mined manganese nodules will not return for millions of years. To combat this, distributing manufactured replacement nodules could be an option. But these possibilities also need to be further explored. The most beneficial mitigation effect would bring a reduction of the sediment plumes and their spreading, as these not only affect the immediate surroundings, but also affect the ecosystem at considerable distances from the nodule harvesting sites. Experimental studies in the 1990s concluded in part that trial mining at a reasonable scale would likely help best constrain real impacts from any commercial mining.

=== Recovery potential of seabed ecosystems ===
The slow recovery potential of ecosystems can be seen as one of the major concerns of nodule mining. Seabed areas that contain nodules will be massively disturbed and the recovery of epifauna is exceptionally slow within the mined areas. A significant proportion of the animals are dependent on the nodules, which create a hard substrate for them. These substrates will not return for millions of years until new nodules are formed. Nodules grow from a few to a few tens of millimeters per million years. Their extreme slow growth rate is not continuous or regular and differs regarding the environment and surface. They may also not grow at all or be completely buried for periods of time. Altogether, manganese nodules grow with an average of 10–20 mm per million years and usually have an age of several million years – if they are not mined. Because many deep-sea species are rare, long-lived and slow to reproduce, and because polymetallic nodules (which may take millions of years to develop to a harvestable size) are an important habitat for deep-sea species, scientists can not rule out that some species would face extinction from habitat removal due to mining. The affected ecosystems would require extremely long time periods to recover, if ever. Nodule mining could affect tens of thousands of square kilometers of deep-sea ecosystems, and ecosystems take millions of years to recover.

== See also ==
- Deep sea mining – Mineral extraction from the ocean floor
- Glomar Explorer – Deep-sea drillship platform used by the CIA to recover sunken Soviet submarine
- International Seabed Authority – Intergovernmental body to regulate mineral-related activities on the seabed
- Manganese oxide – A list of different manganese minerals
- Polymetal – Partitioning of elements in a mineral
- Project Azorian – 1974 CIA project to recover the sunken Soviet submarine K-129
