= Birnessite =

Manganese hydroxide mineral

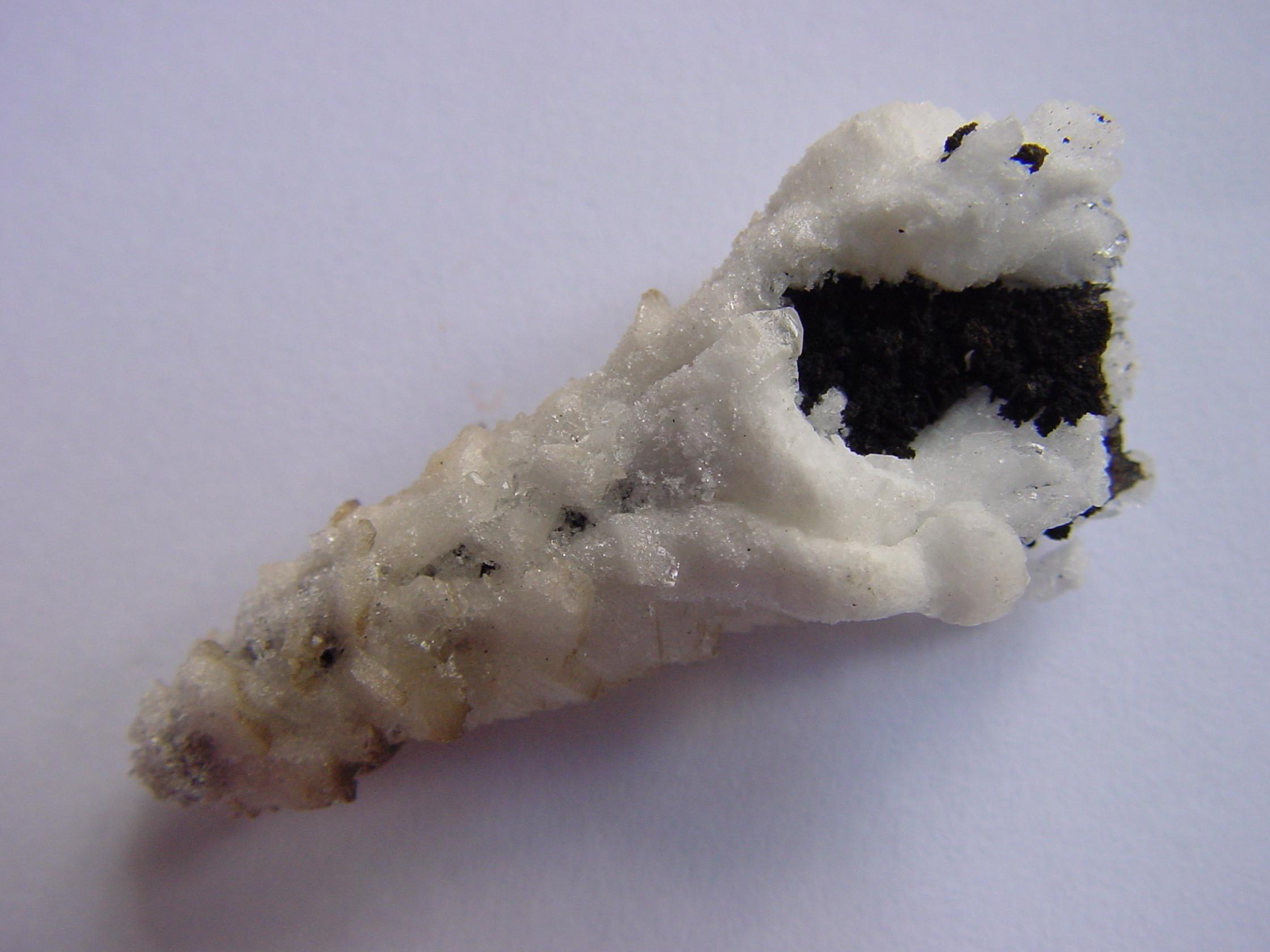

General
- Category: Oxide mineral
- Formula: MnO_{2}·nH_{2}O δ-MnO_{2}
- IMA symbol: Bir
- Crystal system: Triclinic or Hexagonal

Identification
- Color: Dark brown to black
- Crystal habit: Extremely finely crystalline
- Cleavage: [001] perfect
- Mohs scale hardness: 1.5
- Luster: Sub-metallic, dull
- Diaphaneity: Nearly opaque
- Specific gravity: 3.0
- Optical properties: Uniaxial (−)
- Refractive index: nω = 1.730 nε = 1.690
- Birefringence: δ = 0.040
- Other characteristics: Identification by optical properties is impossible.

Birnessite (nominally MnO_{2}·nH_{2}O), also known as δ-MnO_{2}, is a hydrous manganese dioxide mineral with a chemical formula of Na_{0.7}Ca_{0.3}Mn_{7}O_{14}·2.8H_{2}O. It is the main manganese mineral species at the Earth's surface, and commonly occurs as fine-grained, poorly crystallized aggregates in soils, sediments, grain and rock coatings (e.g., desert varnish), and marine ferromanganese nodules and crusts. It was discovered at Birness, Aberdeenshire, Scotland.

== Formation ==
Its precipitation from the oxidation of Mn(II) in oxygenated aqueous solutions is kinetically hindered and slow on mineral surfaces. Biological Mn(II) oxidation is generally fast relative to abiotic Mn(II) oxidation processes, and for this reason the majority of natural birnessites is believed to be produced by microorganisms, especially bacteria, but also fungi.

== Composition and structure ==
Birnessite is a non-stoichiometric compound, in which variable amounts of Mn^{4+} ions in the nominal MnO_{2}·nH_{2}O formula either are missing, or are replaced primarily by Mn^{3+} ions and secondarily by Mn^{2+} ions. Because a solid is overall electrically neutral, birnessite contains foreign cations to balance the net negative charge created by Mn^{4+} vacancies and heterovalent Mn substitutions.

Two crystallographic structures are known, triclinic birnessite (TcBi) and hexagonal birnessite (HBi). The two of them consist of layers of edge-sharing MnO_{6} octahedra separated by one or two layers of water molecules. The one-water layer compounds have a characteristic ~7 Å repeat in the layer stacking direction, and addition of a second water layer expands the layer spacing to ~10 Å. The 10 Å form is named buserite.

The layer composition of TcBi is typically Mn^{4+}_{0.69}Mn^{3+}_{0.31}. The Mn^{3+}O_{6} and Mn^{4+}O_{6} octahedra are fully ordered in raws in the MnO_{2} layers, such that every Mn^{3+}-rich row alternates with two Mn^{4+}-rich rows.^{10,11} The layer charge is offset by alkaline and alkali-earth cations (e.g., Na, K, Ca, Ba) into the interlayer region along with water molecules, and therefore TcBi has a cation-exchange capacity. A typical chemical formula of Na-exchanged TcBi is Na_{0.31}(Mn^{4+}_{0.69} Mn^{3+}_{0.31})O_{2}·0.4H_{2}O.

The layer structure of HBi differs from that of TcBi by the presence of octahedral Mn^{4+} vacancies (Vac). The chemical formula of synthetic HBi depends on pH. The generic formula is H^{+}_{x} Mn^{3+}_{y} Mn^{2+}_{z} (Mn^{4+}_{u} Mn^{3+}_{v}Vac_{w})O_{2}, with x + 3y + 2z = v + 4w for neutrality.

The MnO_{2} layers are stacked periodically in synthetic triclinic and hexagonal birnessite crystals. It is, however, rarely the case in natural materials. In addition to being chemically complex, natural birnessite crystals are structurally disordered with respect to the layer stacking and the flatness of the layers. A natural birnessite crystal may contain only a few layers, and they are often bent and always imperfectly stacked with orientational and translational loss of registry. The stacking disorder is referred to as "turbostratic" when the layers are oriented completely at random. Natural birnessite with turbostratically stacked layers is named vernadite, and the synthetic analog is named δ-MnO_{2}. The layer spacing of vernadite can be also ~7 Å or ~10 Å, and interstratification of the two types of layers has been observed on quartz coatings and in ferromanganese crusts.

== Surface reactivity ==
The +4 charge deficit of a vacancy can be balanced by a large variety of interlayer cations forming inner-sphere complexes above and below the vacancies (e.g., Ca, Cu, Zn, Pb, Cd, Tl). The relative stability of the interlayer cations has been evaluated experimentally and theoretically by surface complexation modeling and computational chemistry. Pb^{2+} has the highest stability at the HBi surface, and the high geochemical affinity of Pb^{2+} for birnessite probably explains its billion-fold enrichment in marine ferromanganese deposits compared to seawater, which surpasses those of all other elements.

Transition metal cations sorbed on vacancies were also observed to enter the underlying vacancies and become incorporated into the MnO_{2} layer, when their effective ionic radius is close to that of Mn^{4+} (r = 0.53 Å). For example, Zn^{2+} (r = 0.74 Å) was never observed to enter a vacancy site, while Ni^{2+} (r = 0.69 Å) partly enters, and Co^{3+} (r = 0.54 Å) always does. Octahedral high-spin Co^{2+} (r = 0.74 Å) sorbed on a vacancy is transformed into a smaller tetrahedral complex (r = 0.58 Å) to penetrate into the octahedral Mn vacancy, and is subsequently converted to the low-spin state before being oxidized to Co^{3+} by Mn^{4+}, which is reduced to Mn^{3+}. The surface-catalyzed, redox-driven uptake of Co leads also to a billion-fold enrichment in marine ferromanganese deposits compared to Co between ferromanganese deposits and Pb^{2+}.

== Properties and applications ==
In nature, photosynthetic organisms use the high oxidative ability of birnessite-type Mn_{4}CaO_{5} clusters to oxidize water into molecular oxygen through the photosystem II membrane protein complex.

Because of their semiconducting properties, birnessite-type materials are used in a variety of areas, including catalysis and electrochemical energy storage (batteries and pseudocapacitors). The ordering of the Mn^{3+} cations in triclinic birnessite, and the Mn^{4+} vacancies in hexagonal birnessite, both reduce the band gap, and therefore enhance electrical conductivity. Half-metallic behavior was observed for MnO_{2} nanosheets with Mn vacancies, rendering them promising candidates for applications in spintronics.

Birnessite is able to break down prions via oxidation. How well this process works outside the laboratory is unclear.

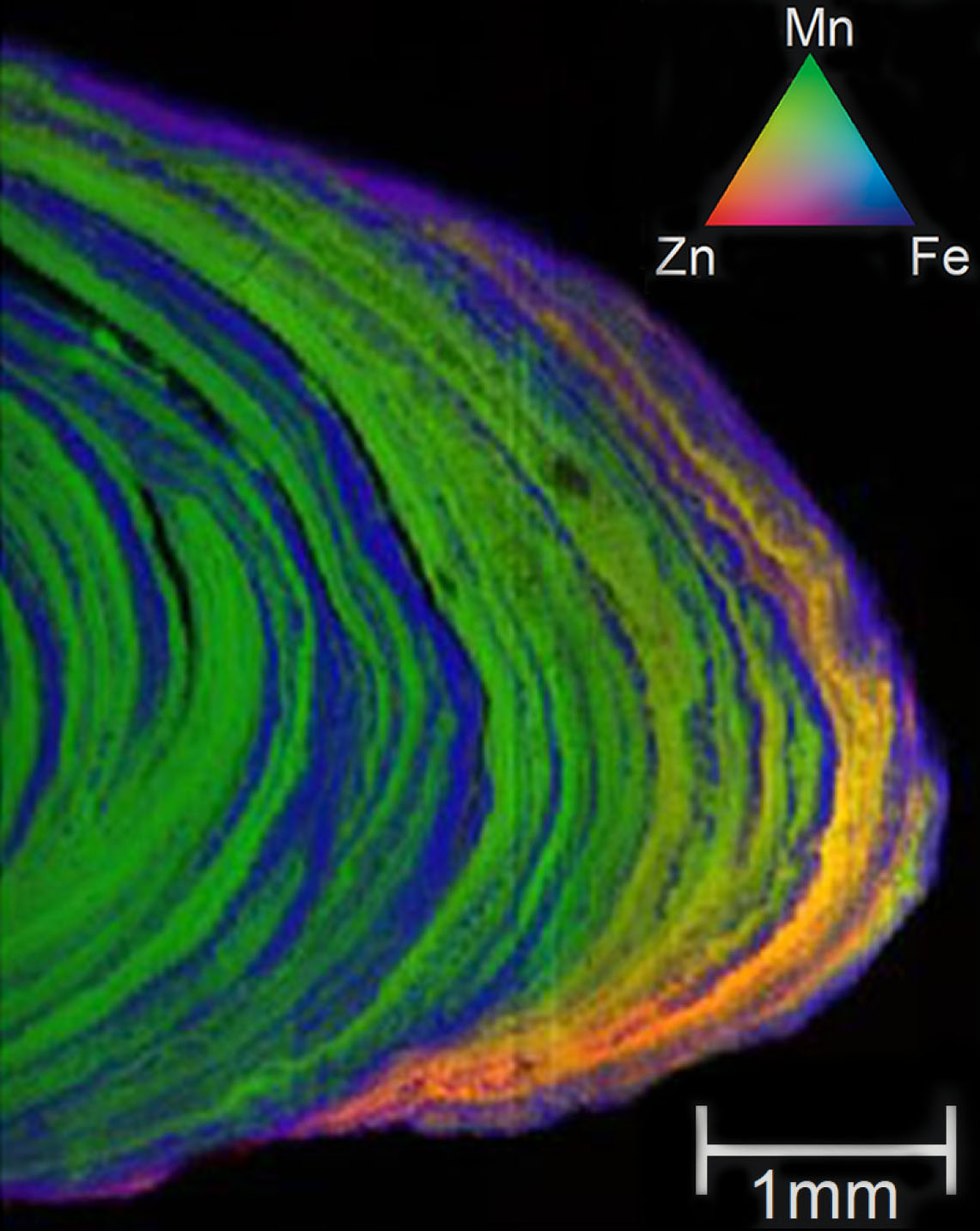
X-ray fluorescence tricolor map of a ferromanganese nodule from the Baltic Sea.

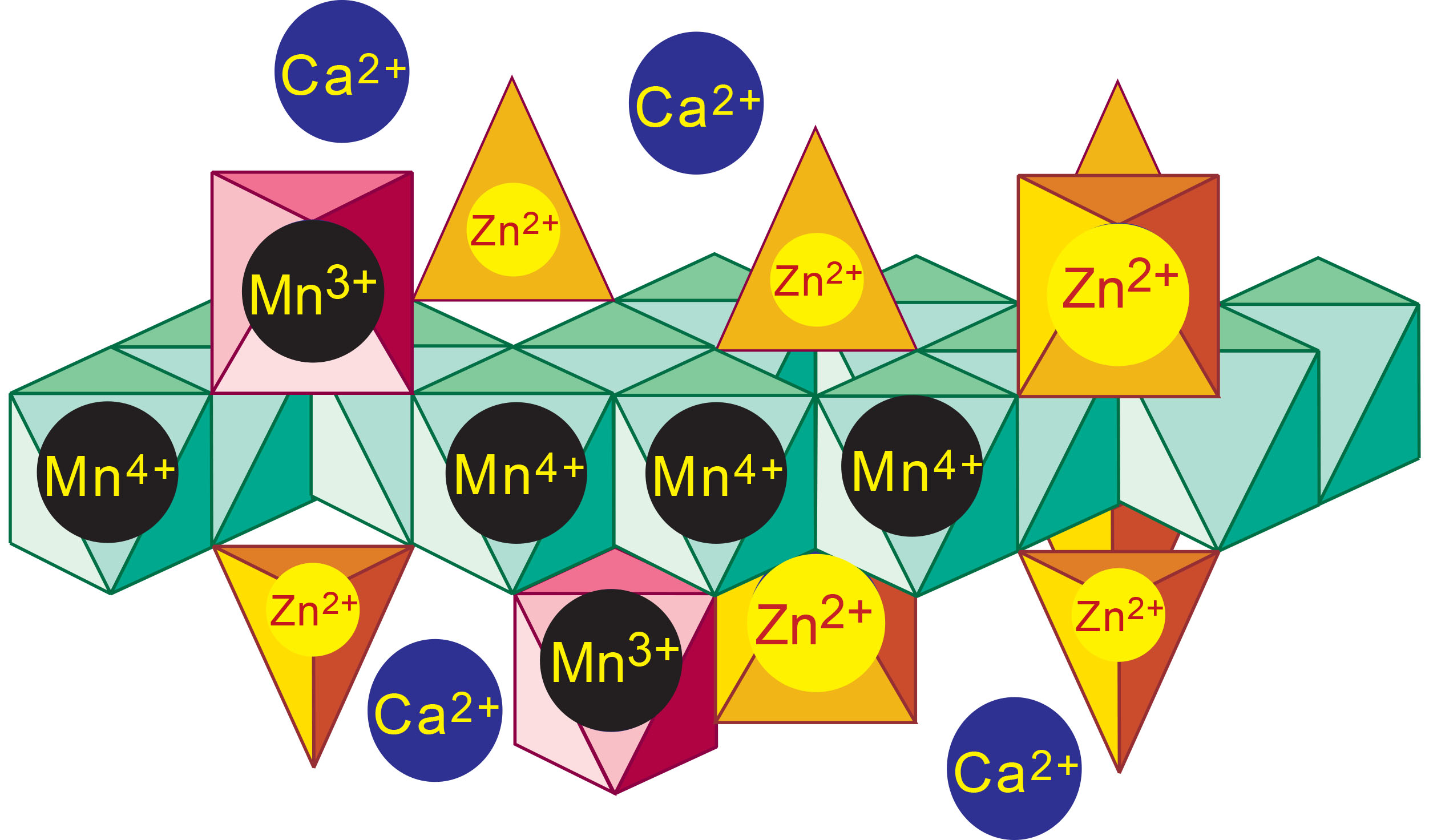
Idealized structure for Zn-rich vernadite nanosheets precipitated in the epidermis of grass roots.

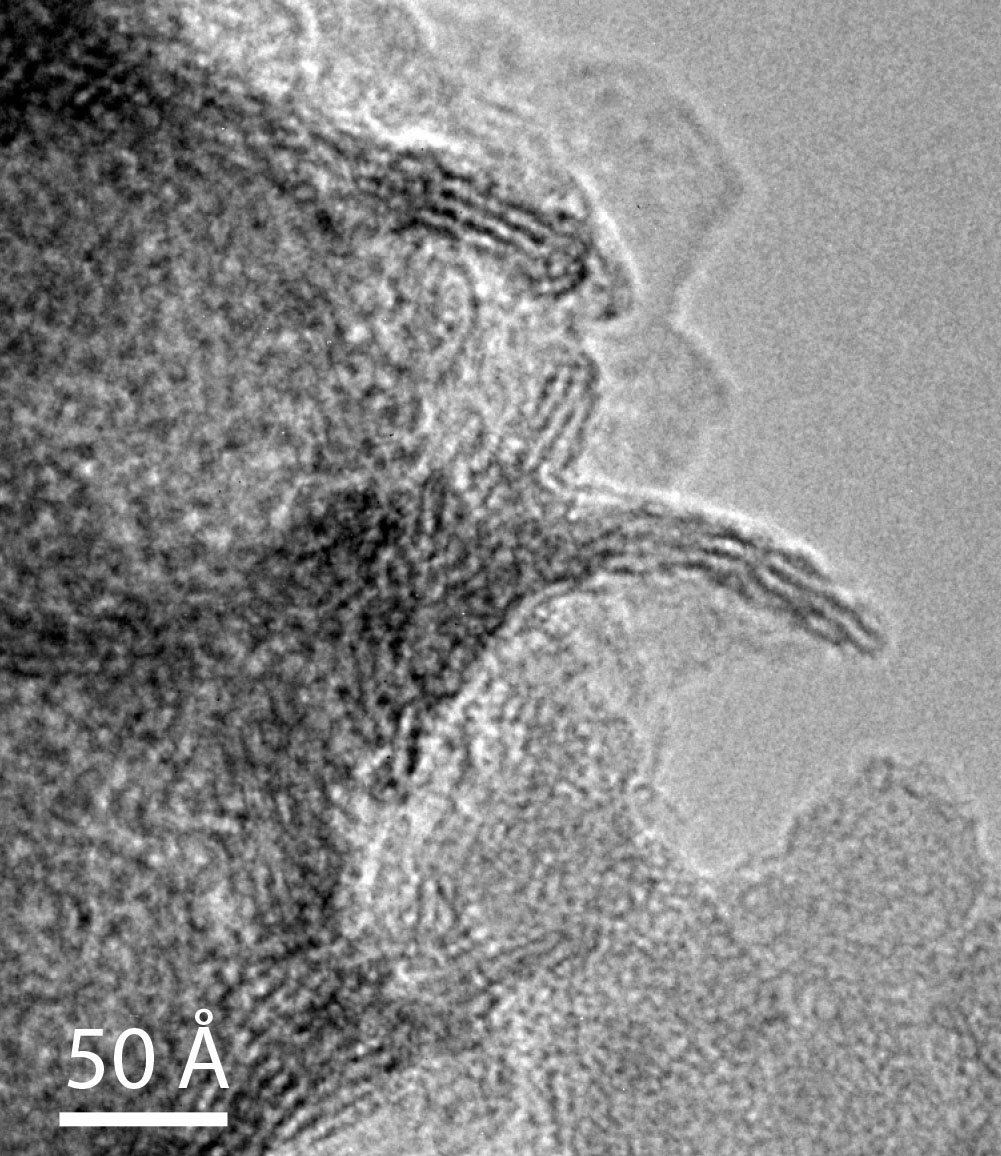
High-magnification transmission electron microscope (TEM) image of δ-MnO_{2} nano-crystals viewed parallel and perpendicular to the layer plane.

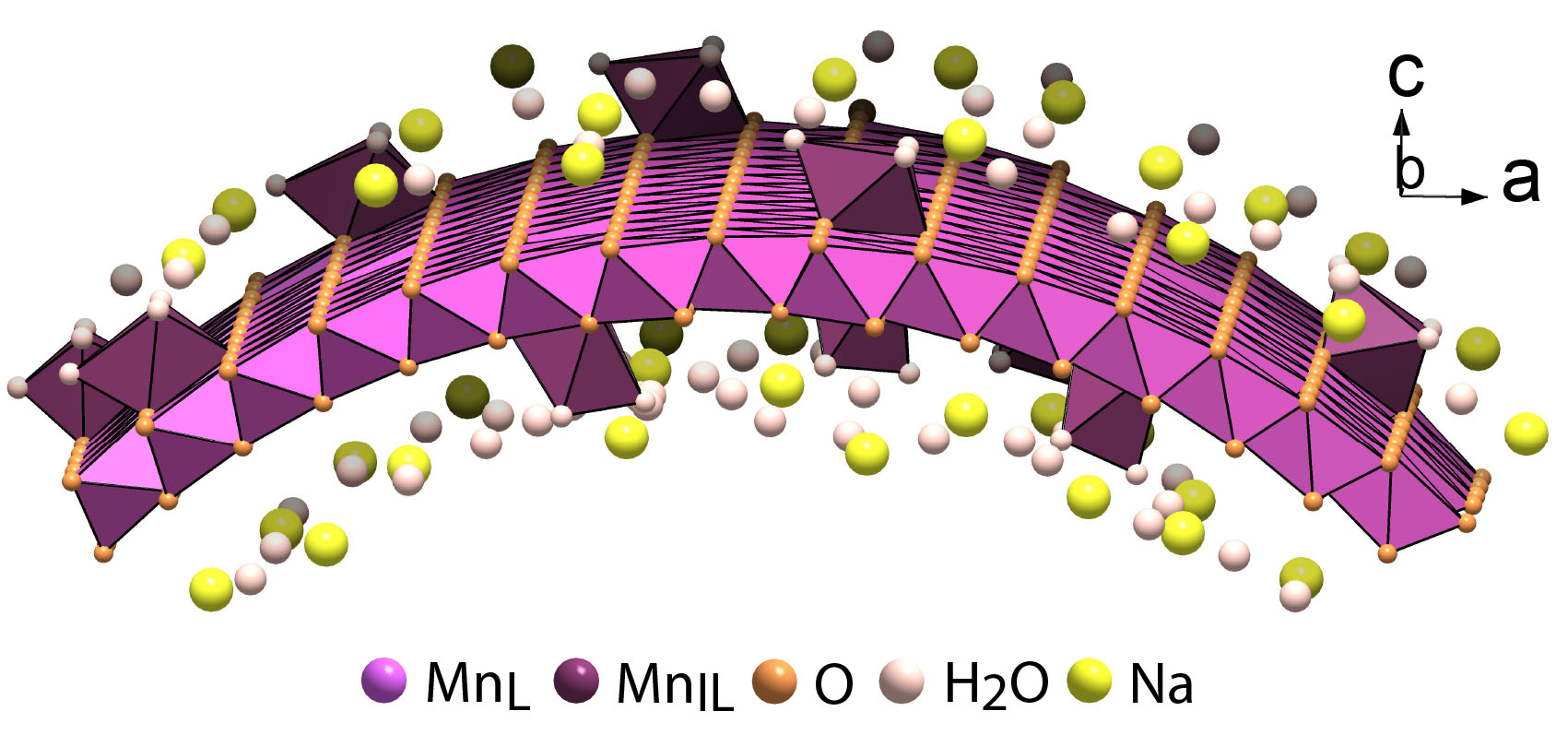
Structure of a cylindrically bent layer of δ-MnO_{2} nanosheet.

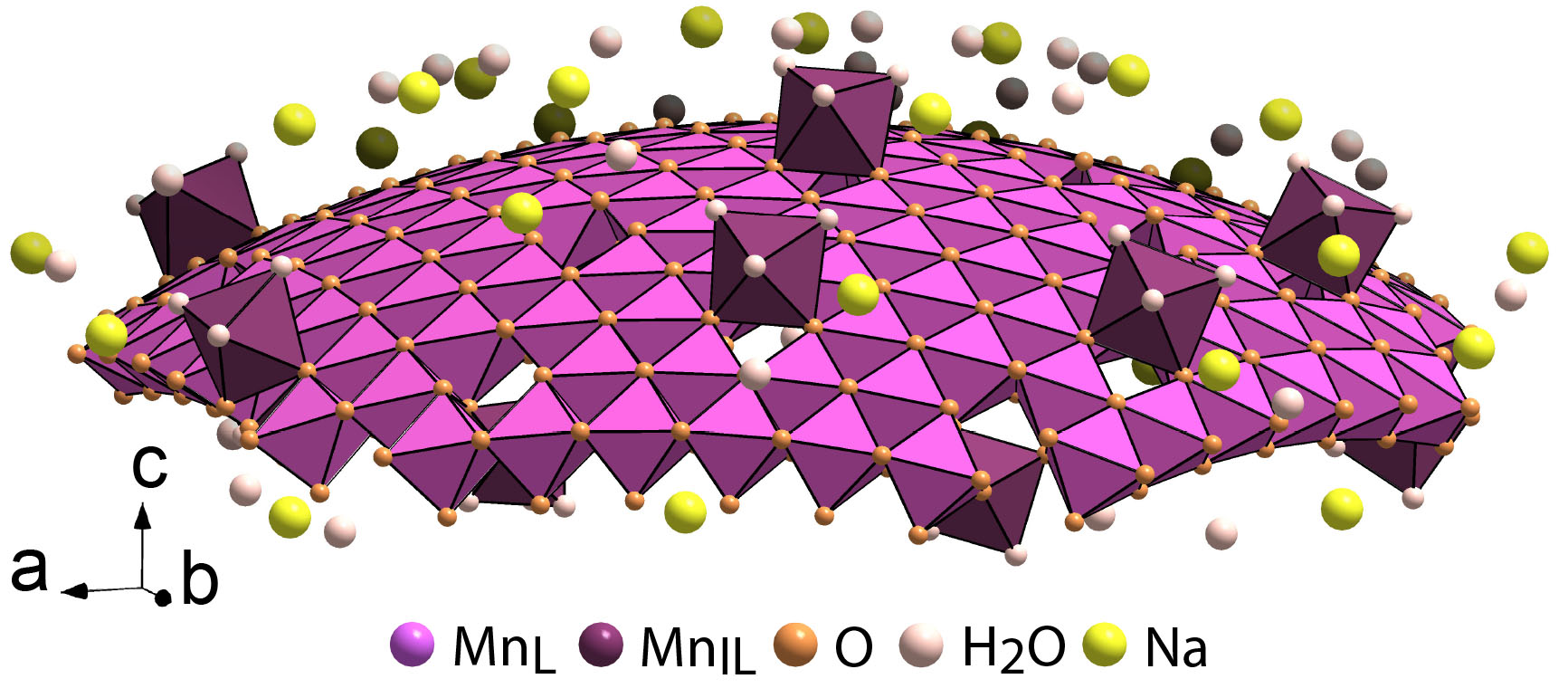
Structure of a spherically bent layer of δ-MnO_{2} nanosheet.

== See also ==
Other manganese oxides:

- Buserite
- Psilomelane
- Pyrolusite
- Ramsdellite
- Todorokite

Similar common iron oxyhydroxides:

- Ferrihydrite
- Hydrous ferric oxides (HFO)
- Limonite
