= Todorokite =

Hydrous manganese oxide mineral

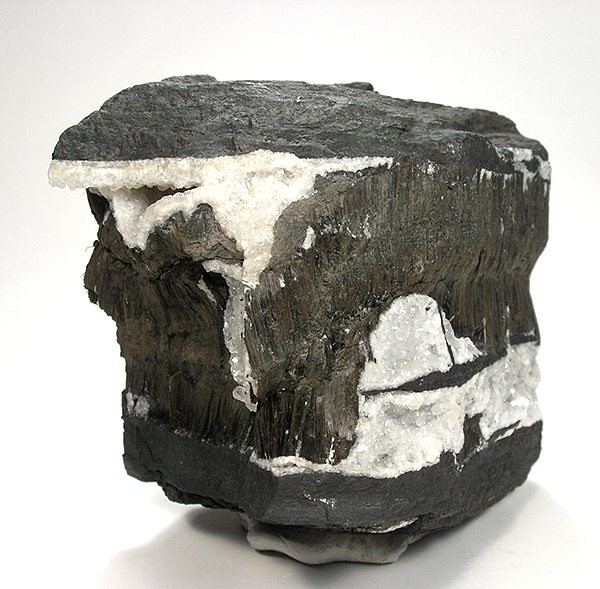
- Todorokite with manjioite and calcite from the Smartt Mine, Kuruman District, South Africa

General
- Category: Manganese minerals
- Formula: (Na,Ca,K,Ba,Sr)_{1-x}(Mn,Mg,Al)_{6}O_{12}·3-4H_{2}O
- IMA symbol: Tdr
- Strunz classification: 4.DK.10 (10 ed); 4/D.09-10 (8 ed)
- Dana classification: 7.8.1.1
- Crystal system: Monoclinic
- Crystal class: Prismatic (2/m) (same H-M symbol)
- Space group: P2/m (no. 11)

Identification
- Formula mass: 583.05 g/mol
- Color: Dark brown or brownish black, brown in transmitted light
- Crystal habit: Aggregates of minute lathlike crystals
- Twinning: Contact twins are common
- Cleavage: Perfect on {100} and {010}
- Mohs scale hardness: 1 1/2
- Luster: Metallic to dull, silky in aggregates
- Streak: Black or dark brown
- Diaphaneity: Opaque, transparent in very thin slivers
- Specific gravity: 3.5 to 3.8
- Optical properties: Biaxial
- Refractive index: Greater than 1.74
- Birefringence: nearly 0.02
- Pleochroism: X = dark brown, Z = yellowish brown
- Fusibility: Does not fuse
- Solubility: Soluble in acids

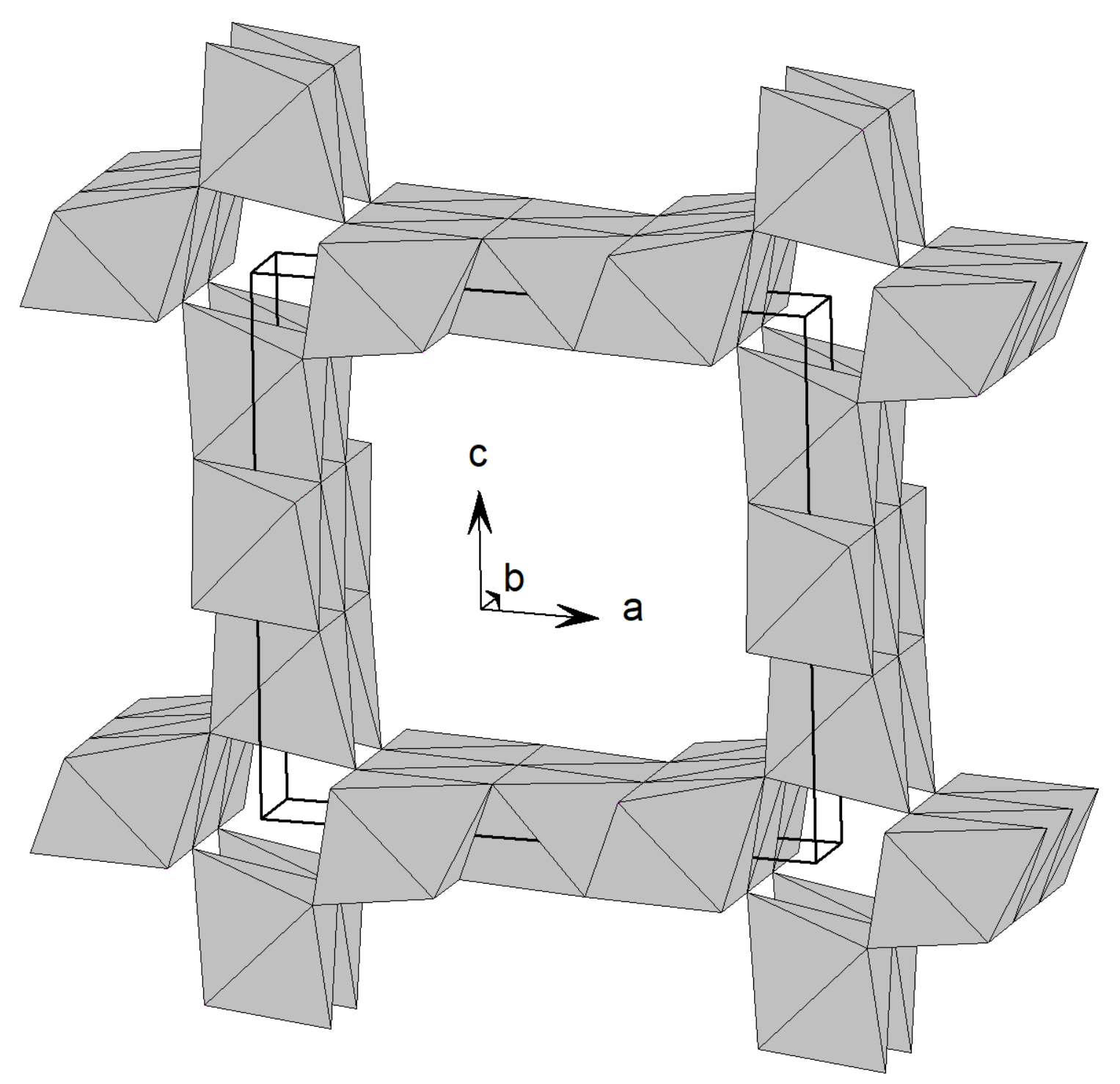
Polyhedral representation of the todorokite structure.

Todorokite is a complex hydrous manganese oxide mineral with generic chemical formula (Na,Ca,K,Ba,Sr)_{1-x}(Mn,Mg,Al)_{6}O_{12}·3-4H_{2}O. It was named in 1934 for the type locality, the Todoroki mine, Hokkaido, Japan. It belongs to the prismatic class 2/m of the monoclinic crystal system, but the angle β between the a and c axes is close to 90°, making it seem orthorhombic. It is a brown to black mineral which occurs in massive or tuberose forms. It is quite soft with a Mohs hardness of 1.5, and a specific gravity of 3.49 – 3.82. It is a component of deep ocean basin manganese nodules.

== Structure ==
Manganese occurs in different oxidation states, including Mn^{2+}, Mn^{3+} and Mn^{4+}. Todorokite is made up of (Mn^{4+}O_{6}) octahedra that share edges to form triple chains. These chains share corners to form roughly square tunnels parallel to the b crystal axis. The tunnels accommodate water molecules and large cations such as potassium K^{+}, barium Ba^{2+}, silver Ag^{+}, lead Pb^{2+}, calcium Ca^{2+} and sodium Na^{+}. The octahedra at the edges of the triple chains are larger than those in the middle and therefore are likely to accommodate the larger cations (magnesium Mg^{2+}, manganese Mn^{3+}, copper Cu^{2+}, cobalt Co^{2+}, nickel Ni^{2+} etc.), whilst the middle octahedra are occupied by the smaller Mn^{4+} cations. This structure is similar to that of hollandite (Ba,Mn^{2+})Mn^{4+}_{7}O_{16} and romanèchite (Ba,H_{2}O)_{2}(Mn^{4+},Mn^{3+})_{5}O_{10}, but with larger tunnels. Although tunnels formed from triple chains of octahedra are most common in todorokite, occasional tunnels have been observed in crystals from both terrestrial and manganese nodule deposits that have one pair of sides formed by triple chains, but with the other pair of sides formed from chains 4, 5, 6, 8 or more octahedra wide.

== Unit cell ==
The unit cell has six manganese Mn^{4+} sites and twelve oxygen O^{2−} sites constituting the octahedral framework. Mg and Al may substitute for Mn, and the tunnels contain large cations and water molecules.

There is one formula unit per unit cell (Z = 1). The side lengths are a = 9.8 Å, b = 2.8 Å and c = 9.6 Å, with angle β = 94.1°. More detailed values given in the references are:

- a = 9.764 Å, b = 2.842 Å, c = 9.551 Å, β = 94.14°
- a = 9.7570(15) Å, b = 2.8419(5) Å, c = 9.5684(14) Å, β = 94.074(14)°
- a = 9.75 Å, b = 2.849 Å, c = 9.59 Å β = 90°

Varieties also occur with a = 14.6 Å and a = 24.38 Å, having the same b and c values as above.
Epitaxial intergrowths of elongated crystallites resembling the twinned variety of acicular rutile have been observed by electron microscopy in todorokites from an iron-manganese concretion from the Pacific Ocean (a = 14.6 Å) and from the Bakal deposit (a = 14.6 Å and 24.4 Å). Todorokites with around 25 Å have been found in samples from Sterling Hill and the Takhte-Karacha deposit.

== Appearance ==
Todorokite occurs as spongy banded and reniform (kidney-shaped) aggregates composed of minute lathlike crystals. The crystals are flattened parallel to the plane containing the a and c crystal axes, and elongated parallel to the c axis. Minerals of the hollandite-cryptomelane and romanèchite groups also have fibrous or acicular habits and two perfect cleavages parallel to the fiber axis. Todorokite is dark brown to brownish black in color and brown in transmitted light. It has a black to dark brown streak and the luster is metallic to dull, but silky in aggregates. It is opaque in all but the thinnest slivers, which are transparent.

== Optical properties ==
Todorokite is biaxial, as are all monoclinic (and orthorhombic) minerals. In the polariscope, and in the polarizing microscope, specimens may be illuminated from below by light that is polarized by the polarizer, and viewed from above through an analyzer that transmits light of only one direction of polarization. When the directions of polarization of the polarizer and analyzer are at right angles, the specimen is said to be viewed between crossed polars. When todorokite is rotated between crossed polars it appears dark and light in turn, being dark when the crystal face or cleavage face is parallel to one direction of polarization. This is called parallel extinction. All uniaxial minerals display parallel extinction, but so do orthorhombic biaxial minerals such as olivine and orthopyroxenes.

The refractive index of todorokite has not been determined, except insofar as it is very high; the original report gave it as greater than 1.74, and a later investigation put it even higher, greater than 2.00. For comparison, diamond has a refractive index of 2.42 and quartz 1.54. A biaxial crystal has three mutually perpendicular optical directions, X, Y and Z, with different refractive indices α, β and γ for light vibrating in planes perpendicular to these directions. The birefringence is the numerical difference between the greatest and the least of these indices; for todorokite it is nearly 0.02. Todorokite is distinctly pleochroic, appearing dark brown when viewed along the X direction, and yellowish brown when viewed along the Z direction [3], but the strength of the effect varies from faint to strong in material from different localities. The orientation of optical directions with respect to the lattice parameters is Y parallel to b and Z near or parallel to c.

== Physical properties ==
Todorokite has perfect cleavage parallel to the plane containing the b and c axes, and parallel to the plane containing the a and c axes. Contact twins occur frequently. The mineral is very soft, with hardness only 1 1/2. It is generally fibrous, making it difficult to measure the specific gravity accurately. The Berman balance measures the relative weights of the specimen in air and in water; when todorokite was tested in this way it gave a value of 3.49. The pycnometer measures the mass and the volume of the specimen directly; this method gave a value of 3.66 to 3.82 for todorokite. The pycnometer is more likely to give an accurate reading for a fibrous material.

== Solubility ==
Todorokite is soluble in hydrochloric acid (HCl) with the evolution of chlorine (Cl_{2}), and in concentrated sulfuric acid (H_{2}SO_{4}) forming a purple-red solution. It is also soluble in nitric acid (HNO_{3}) forming a residue of manganese dioxide (MnO_{2}).

== Other characteristics ==
When todorokite was first discovered, in 1934, modern methods of mineral analysis were not available, and one of the standard techniques was to use a blowpipe to heat a small sample of the mineral, and observe its behavior. Todorokite was tested in this way, and it was noted that under the blowpipe it turned brown and lost its metallic luster, but did not fuse.

X-ray diffraction lines at 9.5 to 9.8 Å and 4.8 to 4.9 Å are characteristic. This is also true of buserite Na_{4}Mn_{14}O_{27}·21H_{2}O.

== Type locality ==
The type locality is the Todoroki mine, Akaigawa Village (25 km SW of Ginzan), Shiribeshi Province, Hokkaido, Japan. Type material is conserved at the Harvard Mineralogical Museum, Cambridge, Massachusetts, US, reference 106214.

== Occurrence and associations ==
Although todorokite is a common product of oxidation and leaching of primary manganese carbonate and silicate minerals, its major occurrence is in deep-sea ferromanganese nodules. Todorokite has been synthesised from birnessite in the laboratory, and direct evidence for birnessite to todorokite transformation has been observed in iron-manganese concretion buried in hemipelagic sidiments from the Pacific Ocean using high-resolution transmission electron microscopy. At the type locality in Akaigawa, Hokkaido, Japan, todorokite occurs as an alteration product of inesite (Ca_{2}Mn^{2+}_{7}Si_{10}O_{28}(OH)_{2}·5H_{2}O) and rhodochrosite MnCO_{3}). It is found as very fine fibrous flakes about 0.05 mm in length, loosely aggregated in sponge-like masses in druses in gold-bearing quartz veins. The original sample was rather impure since it contained a total of 2.43% insoluble phosphorus salts (P_{2}O_{5}SO_{3}) and silica (SiO_{2}).

== Other localities ==
=== Austria ===
At Huttenberg, Carinthia, Austria, todorokite occurs as nodular masses about 5 cm in diameter, with a fibrous structure and coarse concentric layering. It is fragile, soft and porous, and so light that it can float on water. It is brown, but lighter in color than samples from Charco Redondo in Cuba. The luster of fracture surfaces is dull, but the smooth outer surface of the nodules has a faintly bronze-like appearance. It has a relatively high barium content, and also Mn^{4+}, perhaps due to a small admixture of pyrolusite (Mn^{4+}O_{2}).

=== Brazil ===
Todorokite is a rare constituent of the manganese oxide deposits at Saude and Urandi, in Bahia, Brazil, as a result of supergene enrichment of the metamorphic country rock that contains spessartine (Mn^{2+}_{3}Al_{2}(SiO_{4})_{3}) and other manganese minerals.

=== Cuba ===
At Charco Redondo in Oriente Province, Cuba, fibrous todorokite has been found with fibers to 10 cm in length. It is dark brownish black with a weak silky sheen on fracture surfaces, otherwise the luster is dull. It is difficult to measure the specific gravity because of the fibrous structure; measured values between 3.1 and 3.4 are probably too low. Hardness is low but cannot be measured accurately. Commonly associated minerals are pyrolusite, cryptomelane, manganite, psilomelane, quartz, feldspar and calcite. The manganese ores are interbedded with volcanic tuff, jasper and limestone. The todorokite has been altered near the surface and along faults or fissures to pyrolusite, and perhaps to manganite. The source of the manganese was probably hot springs.

=== Portugal ===
At Farragudo in the Algarve, Portugal, a stalactitic mass of todorokite was found in a small collection of secondary manganese minerals, chiefly cryptomelane (K(Mn^{4+},Mn^{2+})_{8}O_{16}). It is soft and porous, with a fibrous mode of aggregation and dark brown to brownish black color.

=== South Africa ===
Large crystals have been found in the Smartt Mine, Hotazel, and elsewhere in the Kuruman district, Cape Province, South Africa.

=== United States ===
At Sterling Hill, New Jersey, todorokite has been identified in a small collection of secondary manganese oxides from the old surface workings. It forms soft, dark brownish-black masses with a confused fibrous structure. Associated with chalcophanite (ZnMn^{4+}_{3}O_{7}·3H_{2}O) and secondary calcite (CaCO_{3}) crystals in franklinite (ZnFe^{3+}_{2}O_{4}) – willemite (Zn_{2}SiO_{4}) ore.

At Saipan in the Mariana Islands, in the Pacific Ocean, todorokite has been found with the same mode of aggregation and color as that from Charco Redondo in Cuba. It is relatively brittle and hard because it is intimately admixed with finely divided silica, amounting in some cases to as much as 50% of the sample. The content of magnesium is greater than that of barium or calcium.

== See also ==
- Manganese oxide
