= Fifteen-Twenty fracture zone =

Fracture zone on the Mid-Atlantic Ridge

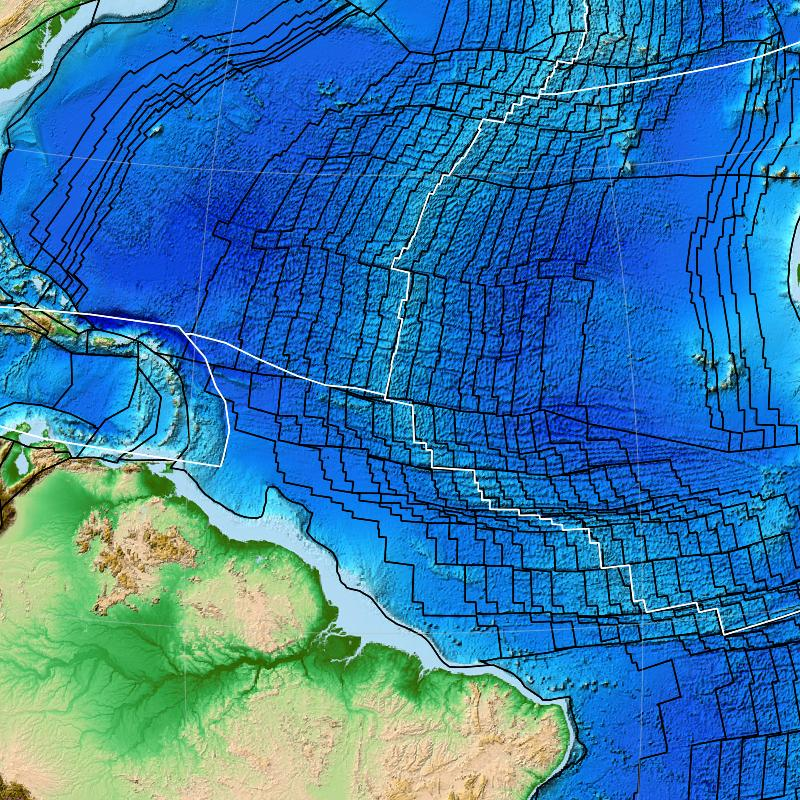
Location of the Fifteen-Twenty fracture zone and the triple junction between the North American, South American, and African (Nubian) plates. The Azores–Gibraltar Transform Fault is in the top right corner.

The Fifteen-Twenty fracture zone (or FTFZ, Cabo Verde fracture zone, 15°20' fracture zone), is a fracture zone located on the Mid-Atlantic Ridge (MAR) in the central Atlantic Ocean between 14 and 16°N. It is the current location of the migrating triple junction marking the boundaries between the North American, South American, and Nubian plates. The FTFZ is roughly parallel to the North and South America—Africa spreading direction and has a broad axial valley produced over the last ten million years by the northward-migrating triple junction. Offsetting the MAR by some 175 km (109 mi), the FTFZ is located on one of the slowest portions of the MAR where the full spreading rate is 25 km (16 mi)/Ma.

== Geological setting ==
Approximate surface projection on oceans of fracture zones is shown.
Key:
- '"`UNIQ--templatestyles-00000000-QINU`"' Fracture zones
- '"`UNIQ--templatestyles-00000001-QINU`"' Probable extension of Fracture zones
- '"`UNIQ--templatestyles-00000002-QINU`"' Fracture zone of relevance to article
- '"`UNIQ--templatestyles-00000003-QINU`"' Probable extension relevant to article
- '"`UNIQ--templatestyles-00000004-QINU`"' Mid-oceanic ridges
- '"`UNIQ--templatestyles-00000005-QINU`"' Sea
- '"`UNIQ--templatestyles-00000006-QINU`"' Land
- Clicking on the rectangle icon enables full window and mouse-over with text detail.'"`UNIQ--ref-00000007-QINU`"'

North and south of the FTFZ the axis of the MAR is near-perpendicular to the spreading direction and the spreading rate is 2.6 mm (0.10 in)/yr.

The axial valley south of the FTFZ is composed of short axial volcanic ridges separated by 8–18 km (5.0–11.2 mi)-long en echelon deeps, while north of the FTFZ the axial ridges are much longer and more linear.

North and south of the FTFZ the ocean floor is relatively smooth with long abyssal hills, probably detachment faults, aligned near-parallel to the ridge axis. In contrast, close to the FTFZ the terrain is more rugged and adorned with short, oblique fault scarps. Associated with the transition between these two types of terrains (at about 15°50'N and 14°30'N respectively) are V-shaped, south-propagating structures. These transitional structures disappear away from the ridge. Within the rugged terrain serpentinized peridotite and gabbro are capped with a thin layer of extrusive basalt. In the smooth areas the lithosphere is more magmatic in composition.

The FTFZ is flanked by two negative gravity anomalies associated with the accretion of igneous crust. The anomaly south of the FTFZ is twice as large as the northern one. There are also geochemical variations across the fracture zone. On the southern side basalts are enriched MORB (mid-ocean ridge basalt) but on the northern side basalts change from enriched to depleted away from the FTFZ. Peridotites collected from south of the FTFZ have an uncommon composition ascribed to a H_{2}O-rich or hot mantle source.

=== Megamullions ===
Corrugated surfaces known as megamullions or oceanic core complexes measure 25 km (16 mi) along-axis and 10–15 km (6.2–9.3 mi) across. When found along other mid-ocean ridges such structures occur at the inside corners of ridge discontinuities, but at the FTFZ they occur on both sides of the ridge away from any non-transform discontinuities. These structures and ultramafic rocks outcropping on either side of the MAR (in contrast to other parts of the ridge) indicate considerably reduced magma supply near the FTFZ. Paradoxically, geochemical analyses of basalts near the FTFZ instead suggest an enriched mantle source and the presence of a mantle hotspot.

Two models can explain these contradictions. A westward ridge jump could relocate an older megamullion on the original western flank to the opposite flank after which a new megamullion start to form on the new western flank. Near the FTFZ this would place the older megamullion in an outside corner while the younger develop in an inside corner. Alternatively, an eastward ridge jump or migration could turn a west-dipping detachment fault into an east-dipping fault, which would also result in an older abandoned and a younger active megamullion. Which is the case is currently not known.

Superimposed on the larger corrugated surfaces are two systems of smaller scale corrugations: one on a 1–3 km (0.62–1.86 mi) scale, roughly 200 m (660 ft) high, and another finer about 100–500 m (330–1,640 ft) wide. The latter occur up to 1 km (0.62 mi)from the ridge and is covered by elevated ridges running parallel to the spreading direction, about 10 m (33 ft) wide, hundreds of metres (yards) long, and 10 m (33 ft) tall. These in turn are covered with cm-scale striations running in the same direction.

== Triple junction ==
The North American–South American–African triple junction is associated with the initial opening of the Atlantic Ocean and has had a complex tectonic history. It probably migrated from near 10°N to its current location near the FTFZ between 72.5 and 35.5 Ma. Both its location and that of the North America–South-American–Caribbean triple junction are debated, however. The initiation and evolution of triple junctions is often associated with mantle plumes, but, if this is the case near the FTFZ, the limited supply of magma suggest an embryonic plume or a local, anomalous mantle composition. The relative movement between the North American and South American plates is very small, but the resulting deformation could possibly explain both off-axis seismicity and the odd mantle composition.
