= Ferecrystals =

Layered material class

Ferecrystals (FCs) are a class of layered materials consisting of atomically thin layers of a transition metal dichalcogenides (TMDC) stacked alternately with metal monochalcogenide layers.

== Introduction ==
The general formula of ferecrystals is [(MX)_{1+δ}]_{m}[TX_{2}]_{n}, where X is Se or Te, M a metal, T a transition metal, and δ represents the crystallographic misfit between the MX and TX_{2} layers. Ferecrystals are characterized by turbostratic disorder, which refers to an apparently random rotation of MX and TX_{2} layers around their crystallographic c-axes and between grains within the layer plane, while maintaining parallel c-axes to the stacking direction. Despite the disorder, continuous layers of composition TX_{2} and MX are usually maintained across grain boundaries throughout the ferecrystal sample. The name "ferecrystals" comes from the Latin word "fere," meaning "almost," referring to the turbostratic disorder and grain-like structure.

== Growth ==
Ferecrystals can be prepared using the modulated elemental reactants (MER) method. Developed by David C. Johnson and his team at the University of Oregon, this technique enables the production of ferecrystals with arbitrary n and m, unlike commonly used synthesis methods.

The MER method involves physical vapor deposition (PVD) of individual monoatomic layers followed by annealing of the deposited precursors. During annealing, self-assembly of the amorphous precursors takes place, resulting in crystallization within the layer plane. This non-epitaxial growth method yields abrupt interfaces and in-plane crystallinity, and enables nearly arbitrary stacking sequences of transition-metal dichalcogenides and metal monochalcogenides.

== Properties ==
The unusual structure of ferecrystals, arising from turbostratic disorder, gives rise to physical properties such as charge density waves, unusual superconductivity, and an extraordinarily low thermal conductivity. With their artificially layered structure, versatility in material combinations and stacking sequences, ferecrystals could serve as model systems for layered superconductors, such as high-temperature superconductors.

== Comparison to MLCs ==
Misfit layer compounds (MLCs) are typically grown as single-crystalline platelets and are described by the same chemical formula as ferecrystals, but they do not exhibit turbostratic disorder. In contrast, ferecrystals have shown evidence of charge density waves (CDW), whereas such an effect has not been reported for MLCs.

In comparison to ferecrystals, misfit layer compounds can be synthesized with limited layer stacking sequences, where m ≤ 3 and n ≤ 3. There are only few compound materials known to have n > 1, and no equilibrium compounds to have n > 3 or m > 2. Crystalline misfit layered tellurides have not been reported, suggesting their thermodynamic instability.
