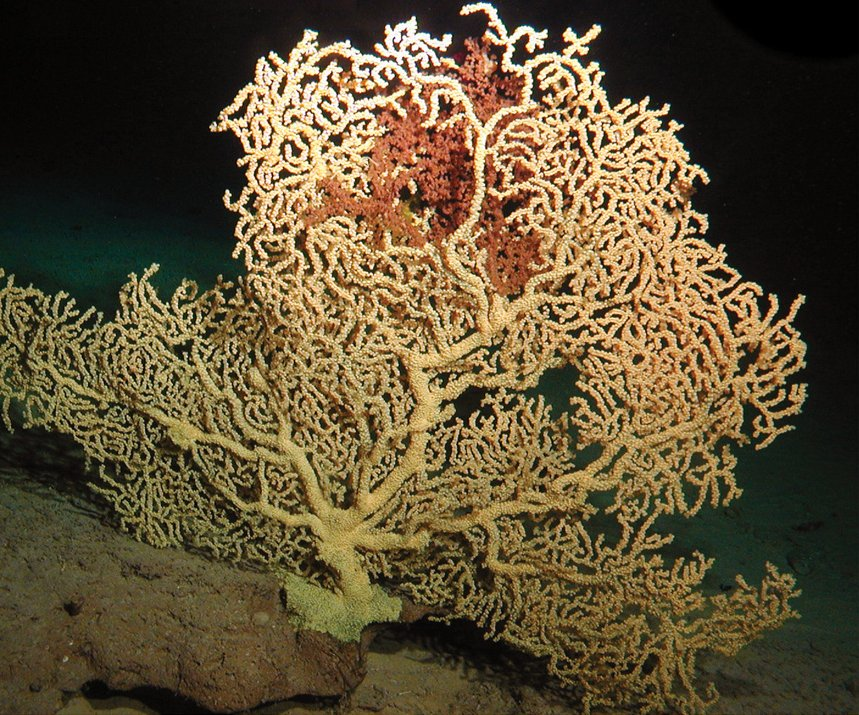
- Kulamanamana haumeaae

Scientific classification
- Kingdom: Animalia
- Phylum: Cnidaria
- Subphylum: Anthozoa
- Class: Hexacorallia
- Order: Zoantharia
- Family: Parazoanthidae
- Genus: Kulamanamana; Sinniger, Ocaña & Baco, 2013
- Species: K. haumeaae

Binomial name
- Kulamanamana haumeaae Sinniger, Ocaña & Baco, 2013

= Hawaiian gold coral =

Species of coral

Hawaiian gold coral (Kulamanamana haumeaae) is a rare, extremely long-lived deep-sea coral found on seamounts near Hawaii. It is the only member of the monotypic genus Kulamanamana. Most colonies can live up to 2,470 years, based on a study using radiocarbon dating. In the Hawaiian Archipelago of the North Pacific Ocean, the Hawaiian gold coral is a crucial species to the ecology of Hawaiian seamounts. This is because it is a dominant macro-invertebrate found in the deep sea, and thus provides an important habitat for an array of invertebrates and fish. Gold coral tissue is reflective under light, and colonies are bioluminescent when mechanically stimulated, or touched. It is predicted that this bioluminescence perhaps attracts prey, however more research is needed to determine exactly what purpose it serves. Although it has been harvested commercially for use in jewelry for a long time, it was not formally described by taxonomists until 2012 when it was found to be related to both the genus Savalia and the octocoral-associated zoanthid, Corallizoanthus tsukaharai. Prior to being formally classified and named Kulamanamana haumeaae, the Hawaiian gold coral was previously known as Gerardia sp.

== Growth Patterns ==
Hawaiian gold corals display an interesting growth mechanism, spreading at a rate of about 2.2 ± 0.69 cm yr−1 cm per year. Radiocarbon dating has been used to determine the radial growth rate of K.haumeaae which exhibits a relatively slow radial growth rate with a remarkable age of 807 ± 30 years for a live-collected specimen, highlighting the species' exceptional longevity. These rates makes it a slow-growing coral species indicating a prolonged maturation process, with colonies taking centuries to millennia to fully develop. These exceptionally slow growth rates and long lifespans old implications for the conservation of gold coral populations considering which underscores the vulnerability of these corals to environmental disturbances and anthropogenic impacts.

A 2015 study focused on the settlement, colonization, and succession patterns of K.haumeaae found that significant portions of the host coral skeleton are lost as it becomes subsumed by gold coral tissue, suggesting that the success of gold coral colonization may rely less on the height or size of the host colony and more on the suitability of the location for growth and survival. This process of succession indicates that gold coral colonization leads to a transformation of the surrounding deep sea community towards a new equilibrium which involves rapid growth and subsuming of the host coral by the gold coral tissue, impacting the overall structure of the coral community.

Gold corals are exceptionally long-lived, which has broader implications for ocean research. Researchers have used them as "paleoarchives," or living records of the past, by analyzing their growth rings that hold information about past chemical makeups of the ocean. As filter feeders, gold corals consume organic material, including dead phytoplankton, that floats down to the deep sea from above. Throughout their life, they grow their skeletons in chronological rings, which contain amino acids that researchers have studied to determine the types of dominant phytoplankton from the past. Ultimately, by studying these rings, researchers can determine how phytoplankton compositions have changed in the past in response to climate changes. Because plankton are important indicators of productivity, and impact marine food-webs, biogeochemical cycles, and the biological carbon pump, this information can offer important insights into the past structure and function of marine ecosystems. It also accentuates awareness of the ways in which the oceans have responded to climate changes in the past, to help scientists determine what changes may be expected in the future.

== Habitat ==
Hawaiian gold corals are found off the coasts of Hawaiian Islands, and have been reported at depths as shallow as 343m, and deep as 575m. They are often found on skeletons of past bamboo coral colonies that have died. Over time, the proliferation of gold coral colonies appears to truncate the size structure of the host coral skeleton population (such as bamboo corals), leading to a shift in community dynamics.

Studies show that environmental factors like temperature, backscatter, and current flow have a complex impact on the habitat of Hawaiian gold coral. These elements are crucial in influencing the coral's distribution and colony density throughout Hawaii's many coral patches. This coral's distribution and dependency on various environmental factors allows for the creation of a complex habitat and the supporting of diverse marine life.

== Ecological role ==
The Hawaiian gold coral is parasitic, as it colonizes a host colony. Coral recruitment, or the process where floating coral larvae attach to a substrate and establish themselves, is a limitation for deep sea coral survival. Their dependence on another coral as a host makes this process even more complicated. As it grows, its protein skeleton completely absorbs and overtakes the host colony. Gold corals most often use bamboo corals as hosts, which grow much faster and are much shorter-lived.

The species provides an important habitat for invertebrates and fish because of its dominance at its depth in the Hawaiian Archipelago. A study from 2006 found that waters with gold corals support a larger density of fish than areas that lack the species, however there is not yet clear evidence that the existence of a gold coral colony causes an aggregation of fish. Gold coral trees have also been evidenced as habitats for deep-water eels and galatheid crabs.

A parasitic barnacle, cirriped of the infraclass Acrothoracica, has been found on Hawaiian gold coral polyps. More information is still needed to determine the interaction between the two species.

== In Jewelry ==
Gold coral is prized in jewelry making for its iridescent qualities, which are similar to tiger's eye. The jewelry trade in fact added to scientists' knowledge of the corals' parasitic characteristics, as when large colonies were collected for jewelry making, they discovered that bamboo corals are a common host for gold coral colonies.

The skeletons of such corals and the jewelry made from them are highly valuable. However, unprocessed skeleton materials are no longer commercially harvested in Hawaii, making them extremely rare. NOAA fisheries has a moratorium on gold coral harvest around the U.S. Pacific Islands, which was recently extended to June 30, 2028. Because the coral is slow-growing, and more research is required on its ecological role and status, this extension prevents overfishing and destruction of the ecosystem before more is known about it. International trade therefore primarily consists of jewelry made from pre-moratorium stock, which may be decades old.
