= Buserite =

Hydrated layered manganese-oxide mineral

Buserite is a hydrated layered manganese-oxide mineral with nominal chemical formula MnO_{2}·nH_{2}O. It was named after Swiss chemist professor Wilhelm Buser (1917-1959), who first identified it in 1952 in deep-sea manganese nodules. Buser named it 10 Å manganate because the periodicity in the layer stacking direction was 10 Å. It was renamed buserite in 1970 by the nomenclature commission of the International Mineralogical Association (IMA).

More recent crystallographic studies have shown that buserite is not a distinct mineral species, but a two-water layer form of the one-water layer phyllomanganate birnessite, which has a characteristic periodicity of 7 Å perpendicularly to the MnO_{2} layers. When taken out of water, buserite may lose one layer of water and transform into birnessite. Some buserite minerals are resistant to dehydration to various degrees, however, depending on the structure of the interlayer. Buserite of marine ferromanganese nodules transforms into birnessite upon heating to 110 °C for several hours.

Natural buserite is most often finely grained and poorly-crystallized. The MnO_{2} layers are generally stacked at random like in vernadite, which is a turbostratic birnessite. For this reason, buserite is also named 10 Å vernadite in the literature.

The relationship between the crystal structure and the properties of hydrated phyllomanganates were studied by Newton and Kwon (2018) using molecular simulations:

Buserite reacts strongly with trace metals due to the presence of octahedral Mn^{4+} vacancies in the MnO_{2} layer. The defective structure of phyllomanganates from the buserite-birnessite family affords them a key geochemical role in many environmental systems that affect soil and water composition via cation exchange and adsorption of trace metals. Slight variations in their structural and chemical composition often result in a dramatic difference in their chemical reactivity.

The enrichment in Co^{2+}, Ni^{2+} and Cu^{2+} of 10 Å vernadite in manganese nodules is manifold.
