= Inner sphere complex =

Type of ion-surface binding

Inner sphere complex is a type of surface complex that refers to the surface chemistry changing a water-surface interface to one without water molecules bridging a ligand to the metal ion. Formation of inner sphere complexes occurs when ions bind directly to the surface with no intervening water molecules. These types of surface complexes are restricted to ions that have a high affinity for surface sites and include specifically adsorbed ions that can bind to the surface through covalent bonding.

Inner sphere complexes describe active surface sites that are involved in nucleation, crystal growth, redox processes, soil chemistry, alongside other reactions taking place between a cation and surface. This affinity to surface sites can be attributed to covalent bonding.

When compared to outer sphere complexes that have water molecules separating ions from ligands, inner sphere complexes have surface hydroxyl groups that function as $\sigma$-donor ligands, increasing the coordinated metal ion's electron density. This is an example of competitive complex formation, in which ligands will compete for space on an activation site of a metal ion.

Surface structures are able to reduce and oxidize ligands, whereas transport phenomena do not. Therefore, surface structure serves an important role in surface reactivity, with the coordination environment at the solid-water interface changing intensity or rate of a reaction.

== Wetting ==
One method to achieve inner sphere complexes is through wetting: a phenomenon where one fluid, known as a wetting agent, replaces another medium, like water or air, on a surface. In the case of a solid-water to a solid-liquid interface, the liquid spreads to increase the solid-liquid and liquid-gas interfacial area, and decreases the solid-gas interfacial and solid-water area as a result.

The spreading coefficient of the liquid is described by the Gibb's Free Energy over the area

$S = -\Delta G_s/A$

The Gibb's Free Energy is spontaneous only when S is positive or zero.

Another method of wetting is adhesional wetting, where the liquid makes contact with the solid surface for the first time. However, this initial wetting decreases the liquid-gas interface that can be modeled by the Dupré equation

$W_a = -\Delta G_a / A$

Or by the revised Dupré-Young equation

$W_a = -\gamma_{LG} (1 + cos(\theta))$

Immersional wetting that has a metal ion completely immersed in a liquid ligand solution does not have a change in liquid-gas interface. This reaction can be modeled by

$-\Delta G_i = \gamma_{SG} - \gamma_{SL}$

$= \gamma_{LG} cos \theta$

From these models, metal ions can be influenced by contact angle, and as a result, inner sphere complexes are influenced by wetting agents and wetting procedures.

== Sorption and Adsorption of Ligands on Metal Oxides ==
An example of sorption of ligands occurs in metallic oxides and silicate surfaces. In a mineral surface, the metal ion acts as a Lewis acid, and the ligands act as the Lewis base. For ligands that have protons, the sorption is dependent on the pH.

In cases of where ligands affect the surface coordination by performing a redox reaction, the sorption phenomenon are then referred to as adsorption. This is of particular importance because different surfaces and ligands have varying redox intensity that can catalyze various reactions.

== Dissolution of Oxides ==
When exposed to water, the metal oxide that was previously an inner sphere complex will become saturated with water, which is known as a dissolution reaction. This can also be observed in cases where hydroxyl groups are also present.

pH is a consideration within these reactions, but the symmetrical, molecular adsorption of water is considered unstable and possesses a high activation energy.

As a result, the rate determining step relies on the breakage of a critical oxo bond that may increase inductive effects through changes in electron density. This causes nucleophilic attacks and further dissolution to occur.

== Applications in soil chemistry ==
Sorption reactions of inner sphere complexes are applicable in the transport and retention of trace elements in soil systems. In particular, the sorbent materials found in nature are often metal-oxide inner sphere complexes.

In nature, this is particularly important for iron and manganese cycling, as both are effected by the redox potential of their environments for weathering to occur. Oxyanions such as $\ce{SO4^2-}$can hinder the dissolution and weathering of these metals. Reductive dissolution in these environments may take longer or be non-existent as a result. However, an understanding of this has led to greater usage of oxyanions in built environments where corrosion and weathering needs to be limited.

Ion size of the central metal and of inorganic ligands also play a role in the weathering. Alkali earth metals have reduced sorption as their ion size increases due to decreased affinity to anionic charges, which increases their mobility through weathering as a result.

For nonpolar ligands, van der Waals forces instead play a larger role in sorption interactions. Hydrogen bonding does also occur, but is not a part of the adsorption process itself. Due to these factors, the soil quality influences the retention and depletion of nutrients, pollutants, and other ligands that perform sorption with the soil.

Generally, the charged surface of a metallic ion can become charged via crystalline imperfections, chemical reactions at the surface, or sorption at the surface-active ion. Clay minerals are an example of these interactions, and as such can explain chemical homeostasis in the ocean, biogeochemical cycling of metals, and even radioactive waste disposal.

In engineering applications, the clay minerals can promote sodium ion adsorption in petroleum extraction, alongside the creation of environmental liners through the development of a stern layer.

Additionally, water remediation can also be considered a by-product of inner sphere complexes found in clay and other mineral complexes. This is theorized to occur due to metal-metal precipitation, such as in the case of iron-arsenic. However, pH can greatly affect the surface binding effectiveness in this case as well.
