= Paravauxite =

Phosphate mineral

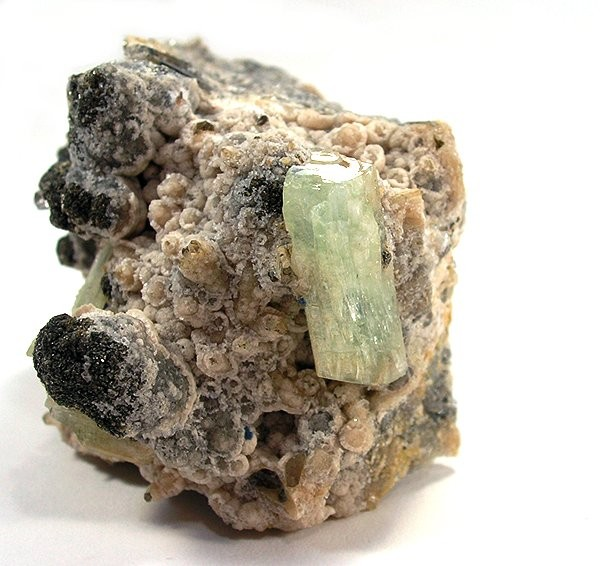

General
- Category: Minerals
- Formula: Fe^{2+}Al_{2}(PO_{4})_{2}(OH)_{2} · 8H_{2}O
- IMA symbol: Pvx
- Strunz classification: 8.DC.30
- Dana classification: 42.11.14.2
- Crystal system: Triclinic
- Crystal class: Pinacoidal; H-M Symbol: 1̅
- Space group: P1̅
- Unit cell: 334.43

Identification
- Formula mass: 477.89
- Color: Light brown, pale greenish white, gray-white, colorless
- Cleavage: Perfect on {010}
- Fracture: Conchoidal
- Tenacity: Brittle
- Mohs scale hardness: 3
- Luster: Sub-Vitreous, resinous, waxy, pearly
- Streak: White
- Diaphaneity: Transparent, translucent
- Specific gravity: 2.36
- Density: Measured: 2.36; Calculated: 2.37
- Optical properties: Biaxial (+)
- Refractive index: n_{α} = 1.552 - 1.554 n_{β} = 1.558 - 1.559 n_{γ} = 1.572 - 1.573
- Birefringence: 0.020
- Pleochroism: None
- 2V angle: Measured: 72° Calculated: 74°
- Dispersion: Weak to distinct
- Extinction: X (61°,56°); Y (180°, 55°); Z (-61°, 54°)

Paravauxite is a rare phosphate mineral that was named in 1922. Its name is a portmanteau word made by blending the Greek word for near (παρα, meaning para) and vauxite due to the chemical relationship to vauxite. It was approved by the IMA, and was first described in 1959. It is now grandfathered, meaning it is probably to remain a species.

== Properties ==
It is a member of the laueite supergroup, and the laueite group within said supergroup. It is metavauxite's triclinic dimorph. It can form in complex granitic pegmatites, and in hydrothermal tin veins. It forms thick tabular crystals on {010}, and short prismatic ones on [001], but numerous forms might be exhibited. Forms aggregates that are subparallel to radial. The mineral is colorless in transmitted light. It mainly consists of oxygen (60.26%), but contains phosphorus (12.96%), iron (11.69%), aluminum (11.29%) and hydrogen (3.80%) as well. It doesn't show any radioactive properties whatsoever. It occurs in tin mines. Paravauxite has a vitreous luster, with one exception on b(100), where it is pearly. It grows in small crystals, which's size can reach up to 5×2×1.5 mm. Crystals are somewhat flattened parallel to b(100). Even with atmospheric humidity, paravauxite's hydrogen dioxide content varies considerably. The mineral's formula is complex, that's why it's really unlikely that it gets simplified by further analyses. There's only one occurrence where vauxite and paravauxite are seen together in one specimen. It's a small, cavernous, mass of druzy-green wavellite. It has blue vauxite in small radial aggregates, and a singular colorless paravauxite. One of blue vauxite's radial aggregates has this crystal implanted on top.

== Formation and mining ==
Other than vauxite and metavauxite, it is also associated with wavellite, but rarely occurs on the latter. It is the type locality of Llallagua, Bolivia. It can also be found in Germany, Mexico, the United States, Portugal, Sweden, with a couple of other countries.
