= Vauxite =

Phosphate mineral

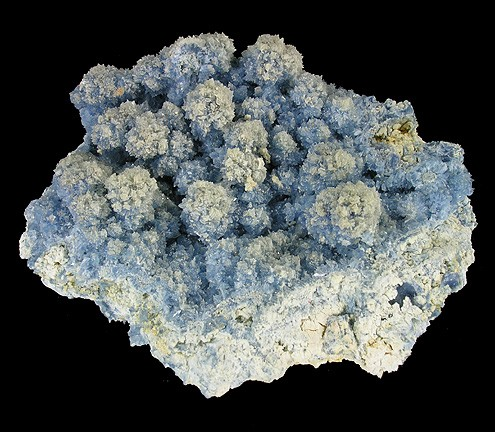
- Vauxite from the Siglio XX Mine, Llallagua, Bolivia. Specimen size 2 cm

General
- Category: Phosphate minerals
- Formula: Fe^{2+}Al_{2}(PO_{4})_{2}(OH)_{2}.6H_{2}O
- IMA symbol: Vx
- Strunz classification: 8.DC.35
- Dana classification: 42.11.14.1
- Crystal system: Triclinic
- Crystal class: Pinacoidal (1̅) (same H-M symbol)
- Space group: P1̅

Identification
- Formula mass: 441.86 g/mol
- Color: Blue, becoming greenish on exposure
- Crystal habit: Minute tabular crystals, radial aggregates and nodules
- Twinning: On {010}, twin and composition plane.
- Cleavage: Fractured
- Mohs scale hardness: 3.5
- Luster: Vitreous
- Streak: White
- Diaphaneity: Transparent to translucent
- Specific gravity: 2.39 to 2.40
- Optical properties: Biaxial (+)
- Refractive index: N_{x}=1.551, N_{y}=1.555, N_{z}=1.562
- Birefringence: r>v
- Pleochroism: (strong): X, Z colorless, Y blue
- Other characteristics: Fluorescent. Not radioactive

Vauxite is a phosphate mineral with the chemical formula Fe^{2+}Al_{2}(PO_{4})_{2}(OH)_{2}·6(H_{2}O). It belongs to the laueite – paravauxite group, paravauxite subgroup, although Mindat puts it as a member of the vantasselite Al_{4}(PO_{4})_{3}(OH)_{3}·9H_{2}O group. There is no similarity in structure between vauxite and paravauxite Fe^{2+}Al_{2}(PO_{4})_{2}(OH)_{2}·8H_{2}O or metavauxite Fe^{3+}Al_{2}(PO_{4})_{2}(OH)_{2}·8H_{2}O, even though they are closely similar chemically and all minerals occur together as secondary minerals. Vauxite was named in 1922 for George Vaux Junior (1863–1927), an American attorney and mineral collector.

== Unit cell ==
The space group is P1̅, which means that the only symmetry element for the crystal is a center of symmetry. The crystal is built up of identical units, called unit cells, which are stacked together so that, in the absence of imperfections, they completely fill the space occupied by the crystal. The unit cell is a rhomboid (each face is a parallelogram, and opposite pairs of faces are equal) with side lengths a, b and c. The angles between the sides are denoted by the Greek letters α, β and γ, where α is the angle between sides b and c, β between c and a, and γ between a and b. For vauxite, the reported values of these parameters differ slightly from reference to reference, as different researchers have studied different samples, but all agree that a = 9.1 Å, b = 11.6 Å, c = 6 Å, α = 98.3°, β = 92° and γ = 108°, to the accuracy stated. Detailed reported values of the lattice parameters are:

- a = 9.13 Å, b = 11.59 Å, c = 6.14 Å, α = 98.3°, β = 92°, γ = 108.4°
- a = 9.142 Å, b = 11.599 Å, c = 6.158 Å, α = 98.29°, β = 91.93°, γ = 108.27°

Within each unit cell there are two units of the formula Fe^{2+}Al_{2}(PO_{4})_{2}(OH)_{2}·6H_{2}O.

== Structure ==
The structure of vauxite is characterised by infinite chains parallel to the c crystal axis. One set of chains is built up of octahedra with a ferrous iron ion Fe^{2+} or an aluminium ion Al in the middle, and an oxygen ion O at each of the six vertices. The central ions of these octahedra are alternately Fe and Al, and adjacent octahedra share edges. At each linked edge two oxygen ions are shared between two octahedra, and each octahedron must have two shared edges to form a chain.

Parallel to these edge-linked octahedral chains are vertex-linked mixed chains of alternating octahedra and tetrahedra. The tetrahedra have a phosphorus ion P in the middle, and oxygen ions O at each of the four vertices, and the octahedra have an aluminium ion Al in the middle surrounded by six oxygen ions O, as in the octahedral chains. At each linked vertex one O is shared between a tetrahedron and an octahedron, and each tetrahedron and octahedron must have two linked vertices to form the mixed chain.

Each octahedral chain is flanked by two mixed chains, one on either side, linked through the vertices of the chains, making an infinite triple chain. The triple chains are further interlinked by yet more phosphorus tetrahedra (not the ones in the mixed chains), which share vertices with both kinds of octahedra in the octahedral chains, and with the aluminium octahedra in the mixed chains. Water molecules (H_{2}O) and hydroxyl ions (OH) are also incorporated into this chain, giving a complex chain with composition [FeAl_{3}(PO_{4})_{4}(OH)_{4}(OH_{2})_{2}]^{5−}. These complex chains, which are parallel to the c crystal axis, are linked in the direction of the a axis by further aluminium octahedra (not the ones in the chains) and in the direction of the b axis by further Fe octahedra, and there are more water molecules within channels in the structure, giving the final formula for vauxite as FeAl_{2}(PO_{4})_{2}(OH)_{2}.6H_{2}O.

== Crystal habit ==
Vauxite crystals are very small and tabular, forming sub-parallel to radial aggregates and nodules. The crystals are flattened parallel to the plane containing the a and c crystal axes, and elongated in the c direction, that is along the length of the chains which are the basis of the structure.

== Optical properties ==
A triclinic mineral, such as vauxite, has all three of its crystal axes of different lengths, and all three interaxial angles of different sizes, with none equal to 60°, 90° or 120°. Consequently, the material is anisotropic, and physical properties, including optical properties, vary with direction. The refractive index is the ratio of the speed of light in vacuum to the speed of light through the medium. Since this varies with the color of the light, a standard color must be chosen when refractive indices are specified. The usual standard is the yellow light from a sodium source, that has wavelength 589.3 nanometers. For an anisotropic substance the refractive index (for light of a given color) varies with direction, and for vauxite the range is from 1.551 for light travelling parallel to the a axis to 1.562 for light travelling parallel to the c axis.

An optic axis is a direction in which light travels through a crystal such that the speed is the same for all directions of polarization for light of any given wavelength (i.e. color). Any direction in an isometric crystal has this property. Trigonal, tetragonal and hexagonal crystals have a single optic axis, parallel to the c crystal axis. They are said to be uniaxial. Triclinic, monoclinic and orthorhombic crystals have two optic axes, and are said to be biaxial. The angle between the two axes is denoted by 2V. Vauxite is biaxial.

=== Optic sign ===
Unpolarized light travels unchanged through an isometric crystal, whatever the direction of travel. In uniaxial and biaxial crystals, light travelling in any direction other than parallel to an optic axis is broken into two polarized rays, the ordinary ray and the extraordinary ray. The ordinary ray travels with the same speed no matter what the direction; this is a consequence of the plane in which it is polarized. The plane of polarization of the extraordinary ray is perpendicular to that of the ordinary ray, and in general its speed will be different. For rays travelling along an optic axis the speeds of the ordinary and extraordinary rays are equal. For all other directions in uniaxial and biaxial crystals the speeds are different. The crystal is said to be positive if the ordinary ray has a greater speed than the extraordinary ray, and negative if the reverse is true. Vauxite is biaxial (+).

=== Dispersion of the optic axes ===
The refractive index varies with the wavelength (color) of light, so the positions of the optic axes in biaxial crystals, and the angle 2V between them, will change when the color of the incident light is changed. This phenomenon is usually expressed in the form r > v, indicating that 2V is greater for red than for violet light, or vice versa. For vauxite r > v, 2V is greater for red light than for violet light.

=== Pleochroism ===
Pleochroism is the phenomenon of crystals appearing to change color as they are rotated in plane polarized light. This is due to differential absorption of light vibrating in different directions. Isometric crystals cannot be pleochroic. Uniaxial crystals (trigonal, tetragonal or hexagonal) may show two, but not three, different colors as they are rotated, then they are said to be dichroic (two colors). Biaxial crystals may show three different colors, and then are said to be pleochroic (many colors). Vauxite is strongly pleochroic, colorless along X and Z and blue along Y.

== Environment ==
Vauxite is a secondary mineral derived from the alteration of apatite in hydrothermal tin veins. It is found associated with wavellite Al_{3}(PO_{4})_{2}(OH)_{3}·5H_{2}O, metavauxite and paravauxite at the type locality, Siglo Veinte Mine (Siglo XX Mine), Llallagua, Rafael Bustillo Province, Potosí Department, Bolivia, which is the only known occurrence of this mineral. The type material is conserved at the US National Museum of Natural History, Washington DC: #97561, #103542.
