= Jach'a Jawira =

Jach'a Jawira (Aymara for "great river", also spelled Jacha Jahuira, Jachcha Jahuira) may refer to:

- Jach'a Jawira or Katari River, a river in the provinces of Aroma, Pacajes, Ingavi and Los Andes, La Paz Department, Bolivia
- Jach'a Jawira (Aroma), a river in the Aroma Province, La Paz Department, Bolivia
- Jach'a Jawira (Calacoto), a river in the Calacoto Municipality, Pacajes Province, La Paz Department, Bolivia
- Jach'a Jawira (Caquiaviri), a river in the Caquiaviri Municipality, Pacajes Province, La Paz Department, Bolivia
- Jach'a Jawira (Chuqi Uta), a river in the Chuqi Uta Municipality, Potosí Department, Bolivia
- Jach'a Jawira (Ingavi), a river in the Ingavi Province, La Paz Department, Bolivia
- Jach'a Jawira (La Paz-Oruro), a river in the La Paz Department and in the Oruro Department, Bolivia
- Jach'a Jawira (Los Andes), a river in the Los Andes and Omasuyos Provinces, La Paz Department, Bolivia
- Jach'a Jawira (Oruro), a river in the Oruro Department, Bolivia
- Jach'a Jawira (Uncía), a river in the Uncía Municipality, Potosí Department, Bolivia
