= Paz Nery Nava =

Bolivian poet and novelist

Paz Nery Nava Bohórquez (1916–1979) was a Bolivian poet and novelist.

== Early life ==
Nava was born in Uncía, Potosí and studied at the Normal School in Sucre. She also studied in Chile.

== Career ==
Nava was a social worker who served for many years in public office working on women's and children's welfare. She was president of the National Association of Social Workers in the 1960s.

As an author, Nava is best known for her writings for children, for example, the 1957 collection of children's poetry titled Syllabary of Dreams. She also wrote the novel Lina (1971). She was part of the literary group Fuego de la Poesía and wrote for the journal Lírica Hispánica in Caracas, Venezuela.

== Personal life ==
Nava married the poet, painter and puppeteer Luis Luksic, whom she divorced five years later. She died in Switzerland in 1979. Streets and schools have been named after her in Bolivia.
