= Jach'a Jawira (Uncía) =

- Etymology: Aymara

Location
- Country: Bolivia
- Region: Potosí Department, Rafael Bustillo Province, Uncía Municipality

Jach'a Jawira (Aymara jach'a big, great, jawira river, "great river", Hispanicized spelling Jachcha Jahuira) is a Bolivian river east of Poopó Lake in the Potosí Department, Rafael Bustillo Province, Uncía Municipality.

== See also ==
- Jach'a Jawira (Chuqi Uta)
