= Uncía Municipality =

- Municipality
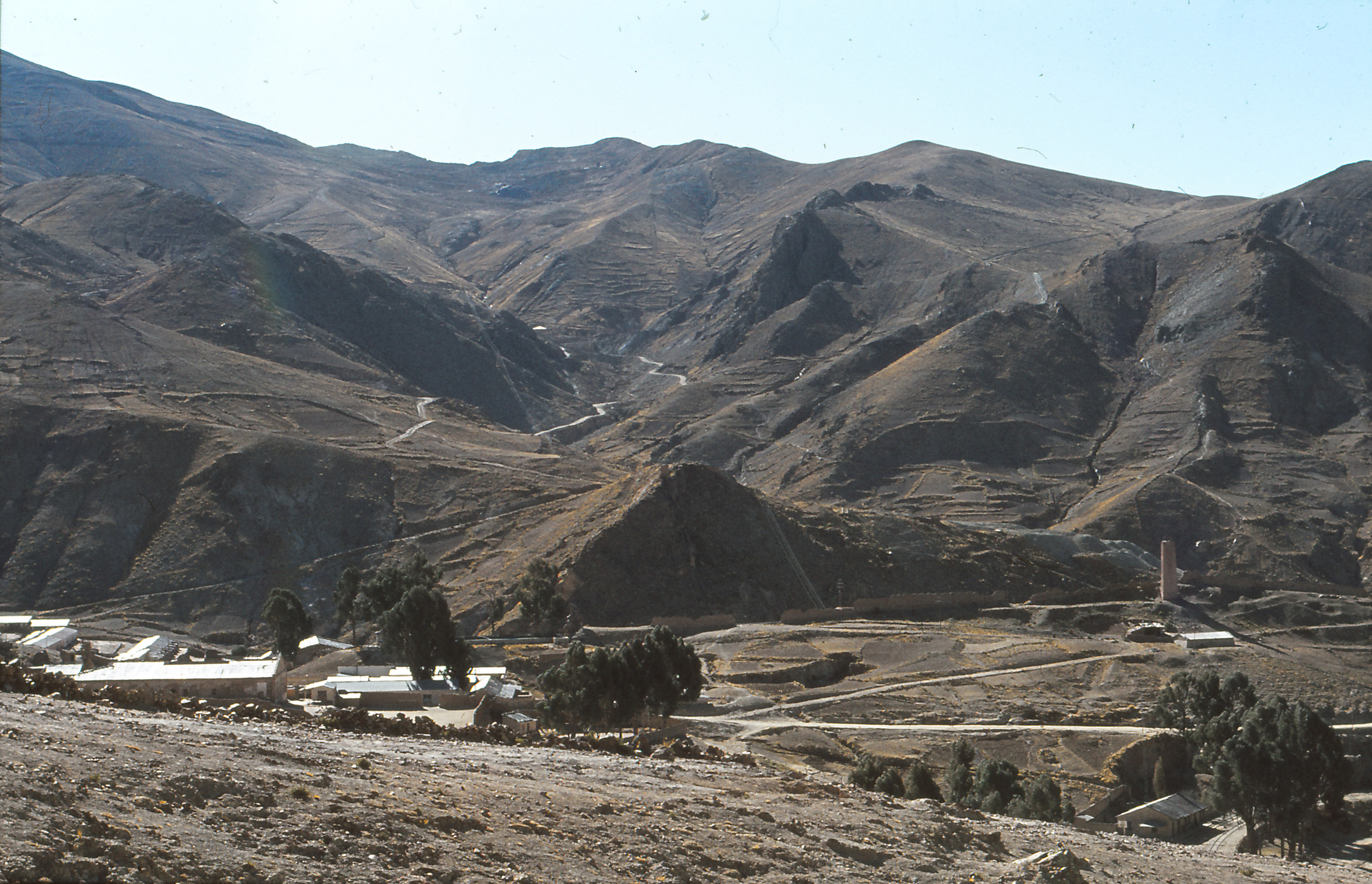
- Landscape near Uncía

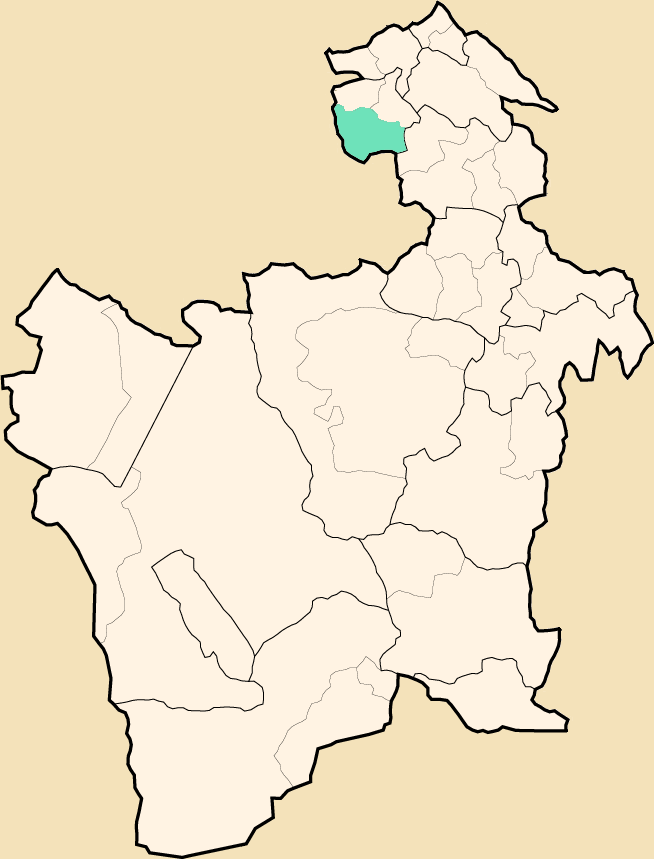
- Location within Potosí Department

- Location within Bolivia
- Coordinates: 18°36′S 66°26′W
- Country: Bolivia
- Department: Potosí Department
- Province: Rafael Bustillo Province
- Seat: Uncía

Population (2001)
  - Total: 18,522 (without Chuquihuta Canton)
  - Ethnicities: Quechua Aymara
- Time zone: UTC-4 (BOT)

Uncía Municipality is the first municipal section of the Rafael Bustillo Province in the Potosí Department in Bolivia. Its seat is Uncía.

== Subdivision ==
The municipality consists of the following cantons:

- Uncía
- Cala Cala (Qala Qala)

Chuqi Uta Canton belonged to the municipality until June 17, 2009, when Chuqi Uta Municipality was created now being the fourth municipal section of the Rafael Bustillo Province.

== The people ==
The people are predominantly indigenous citizens of Quechua and Aymara descent.

Ethnic group	%
Quechua	69.1
Aymara	20.0
Guaraní, Chiquitos, Moxos	0.0
Not indigenous	10.9
Other indigenous groups	0.0

== See also ==
- Jach'a Jawira (Uncía)
