= Llallagua Municipality =

Llallagua Llallawa
- Municipality
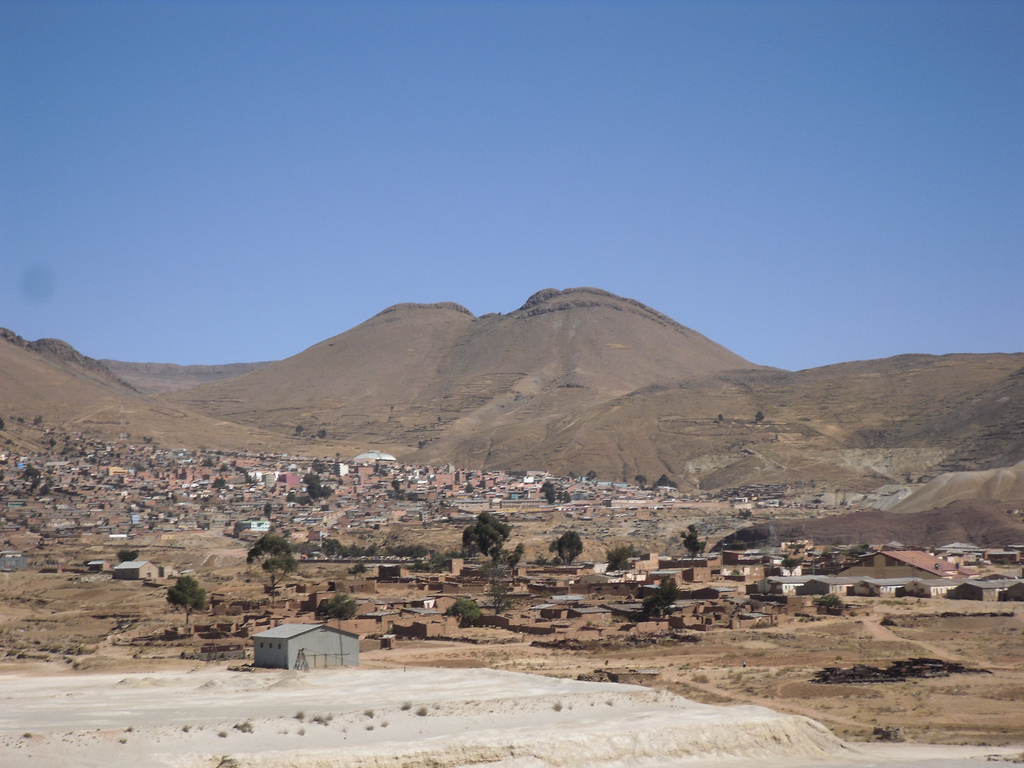
- Llallagua

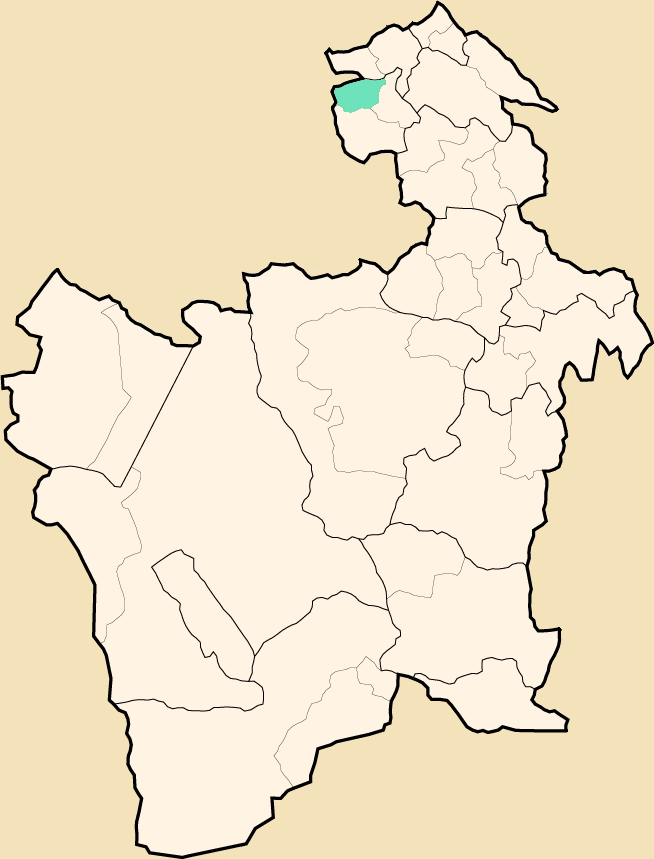
- Location within Potosí Department

- Location within Bolivia
- Coordinates: 18°22′S 66°36′W
- Country: Bolivia
- Department: Potosí Department
- Province: Rafael Bustillo Province
- Seat: Llallagua

Population (2001)
  - Total: 36,909
  - Ethnicities: Quechua Aymara
- Time zone: UTC-4 (-4)

Llallagua Municipality is the third municipal section of the Rafael Bustillo Province in the Potosí Department in Bolivia. Its seat is Llallagua.

== Subdivision ==
The municipality consists of the following cantons:

- Llallagua
- Jachojo

== The people ==
The people are predominantly indigenous citizens of Quechua and Aymara descent.

Ethnic group	%
Quechua	71.6
Aymara	12.8
Guaraní, Chiquitos, Moxos	0.3
Not indigenous	15.1
Other indigenous groups	0.2
