= Crystal habit =

Visible shape of a mineral

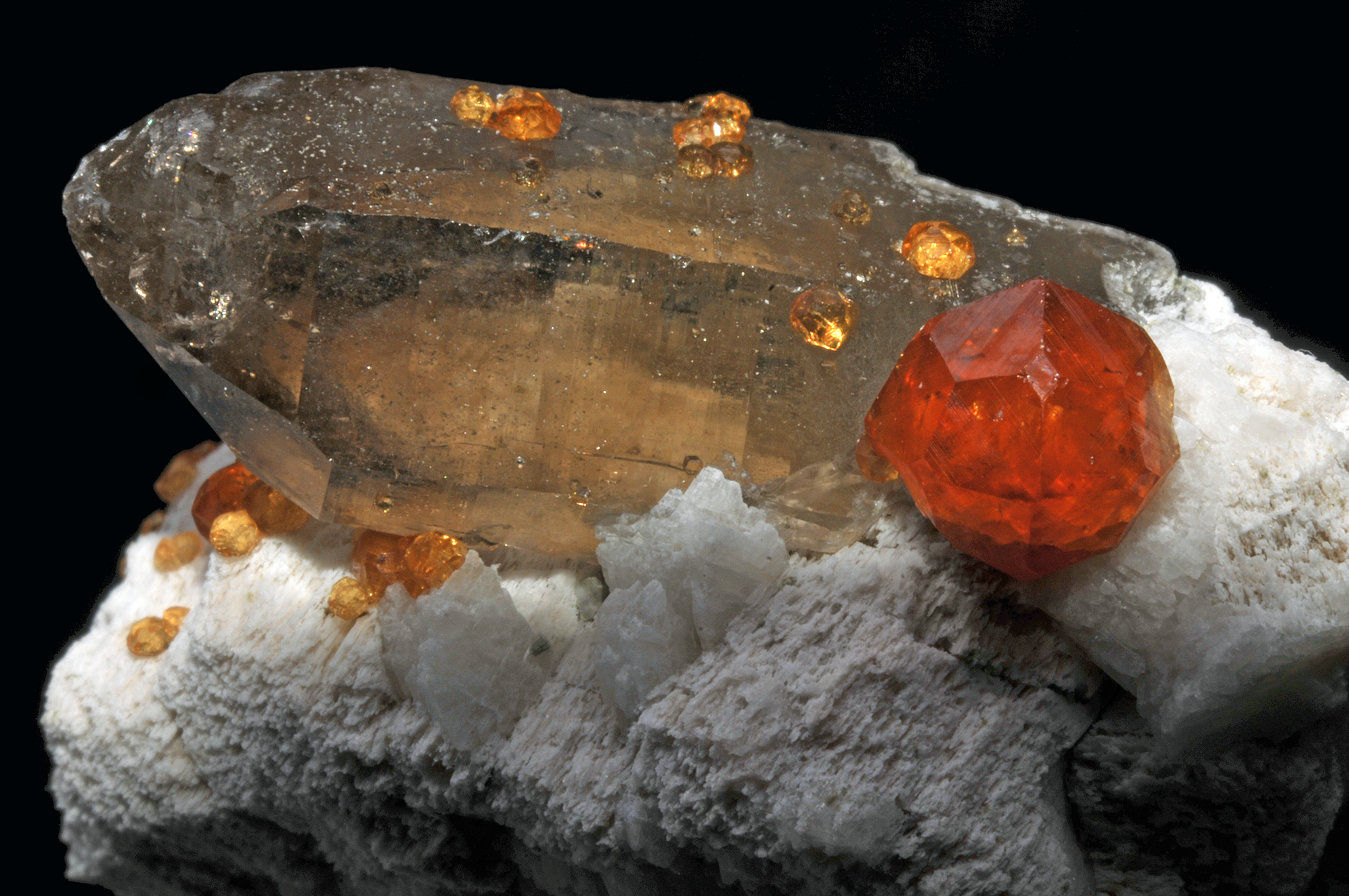
Smoky quartz with spessartine on top of feldspar matrix, featuring different crystal habits (shapes)

In mineralogy, crystal habit is the characteristic external shape of an individual crystal or aggregate of crystals. The habit of a crystal is dependent on its crystallographic form and growth conditions, which generally creates irregularities due to limited space in the crystallizing medium (commonly in rocks).

== Crystal forms ==
Recognizing the habit can aid in mineral identification and description, as the crystal habit is an external representation of the internal ordered atomic arrangement. Most natural crystals, however, do not display ideal habits and are commonly malformed. The quality of the shape of a crystal in a mineral specimen can be described as one of the following:

- Euhedral: a crystal that is completely bounded by its characteristic faces, well-formed. Synonymous terms: idiomorphic, automorphic;
- Subhedral: a crystal partially bounded by its characteristic faces and partially by irregular surfaces. Synonymous terms: hypidiomorphic, hypautomorphic;
- Anhedral: a crystal that lacks any of its characteristic faces, completely malformed. Synonymous terms: allotriomorphic, xenomorphic.

== Altering factors ==
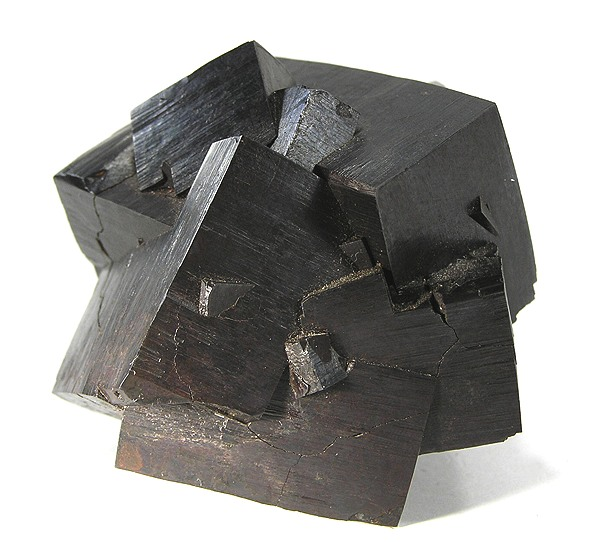
Goethite replacing pyrite cubes

Factors influencing habit include: a combination of two or more crystal forms; trace impurities present during growth; crystal twinning and growth conditions (i.e., heat, pressure, space); and specific growth tendencies such as growth striations. Minerals belonging to the same crystal system do not necessarily exhibit the same habit. Some habits of a mineral are unique to its variety and locality: For example, while most sapphires form elongate barrel-shaped crystals, those found in Montana form stout tabular crystals. Ordinarily, the latter habit is seen only in ruby. Sapphire and ruby are both varieties of the same mineral: corundum.

Some minerals may replace other existing minerals while preserving the original's habit, i.e. pseudomorphous replacement. A classic example is tiger's eye quartz, crocidolite asbestos replaced by silica. While quartz typically forms prismatic (elongate, prism-like) crystals, in tiger's eye the original fibrous habit of crocidolite is preserved.

== List of crystal habits ==
=== Aggregate habits ===
Habit	Image	Description	Common example(s)
Acicular	Natrolite / Scolecite	Needle-like, slender, and end-tapered prisms growing in a radial/globular fashion.	natrolite, scolecite, yuanfuliite
Arborescent	Native silver / Gold	Tree-like crystals growing similar to branches.	Native copper, gold, native silver
Capillary/Filiform	Byssolite / Millerite	Hair-like or thread-like, extremely fine	byssolite, millerite
Colloform/Nodular/Tuberose	Agate / Sphalerite	Rounded, finely banded deposits with irregular concentric protuberances	agate, baryte, sphalerite
Concentric	Amethyst / Rhodocrosite	Circular ring aggregates around a center. This habit is found in cross-sections from reniform/mamillary habits, and also from elongated stalactites of amethyst (quartz), malachites, rhodocrosite, and others	agate, quartz, malachite, rhodocrosite
Dendritic	Native copper / Romanechite	Root-like, branching in one or more direction from central point	Native copper, gold, romanechite, magnesite, native silver
Druse/Encrustation	Celestine / Calcite	Aggregate of crystals coating a surface or cavity, usually found in geodes and some fossils	azurite, celestine, calcite, uvarovite, malachite, quartz
Fibrous/Asbestiform	Tremolite / Baryte	Extremely slender prisms forming muscle-like fibers	actinolite, asbestos, baryte, kyanite, gypsum, nitratine, stilbite, serpentine group
Foliated/Micaceous/Lamellar	Molybdenite / Biotite	Layered crystal planes, parting into thin sheets	biotite, hematite, muscovite, lepidolite, molybdenite
Granular	Uvarovite / Quartz	Aggregates of diminute anhedral crystals in matrix or other surface	andradite, bornite, scheelite, quartz, uvarovite
Hopper	Halite / Bismuth	Outer portions of cubes grow faster than inner portions, creating a concavity similar to that of a hopper	bismuth (artificial), halite, galena
Oolithic	Calcite / Calcite	Small spheres or grains (commonly flattened) that resemble eggs	aragonite, calcite
Pisolitic	Bauxite / Pisolite	Rounded concentric nodules often found in sedimentary rocks. Much larger than oolithic	aragonite, bauxite, calcite, pisolite
Platy/Tabular/Blocky	Baryte / Wulfenite	Flat, tablet-shaped, prominent pinnacoid	baryte, feldspar, topaz, vanadinite, wulfenite
Plumose	Aurichalcite / Okenite	Fine, feather-like scales	aurichalcite, okenite, mottramite
Radial/Radiating/Divergent	Atacamite / Pyrophyllite	Radiating outward from a central point without producing a star (crystals are generally separated and have different lengths).	aenigmatite, atacamite, epidote, pyrophyllite, stibnite
Reticulated	Cerussite / Rutile	Crystals forming triangular net-like intergrowths.	cerussite, rutile
Rosette/Lenticular	Baryte / Gypsum	Platy, radiating rose-like aggregate (also lens shaped crystals)	gypsum, baryte, calcite
Stalactitic	Chrysocolla / Calcite	Forming as stalactites or stalagmites; cylindrical or cone-shaped. Their cross-sections often reveal a "concentric" pattern	calcite, chalcedony, chrysocolla, goethite, malachite, romanechite
Stellate	Hematite / Wavellite	Star-like, radial fibers found inside spherical habits, such as mamillary or reniform.	hematite, pectolite, shattuckite, wavellite

=== Asymmetrical/Irregular habits ===
Habit	Image	Description	Common example(s)
Amygdaloidal	Heulandite / Stilbite	Like embedded almonds	heulandite, stilbite, zircon
Hemimorphic	Hemimorphite / Olivine	Doubly terminated crystal with two differently shaped ends	elbaite, hemimorphite, olivine
Massive/Compact	Turquoise / Quartz	Shapeless, no distinctive external crystal shape	limonite, turquoise, cinnabar, quartz, realgar, lazurite
Sceptered	Amethyst / Baryte	Crystal growth stops and continues at the top of the crystal, but not at the bottom. Exceptional aggregates of this habit (such as quartz) are often referred as "Elestial".	baryte, calcite, marcasite, quartz

=== Symmetrical habits ===
Habit	Image	Description	Common example(s)
Cubic	Halite / Pyrite	Cube-shaped	fluorite, pyrite, galena, halite
Dodecahedral	Pyrite / Almandine	Dodecahedron-shaped, 12-sided. Central facet can vary.	garnet, pyrite
Enantiomorphic	Aragonite / Staurolite	Mirror-image habit (i.e. crystal twinning) and optical characteristics; right- and left-handed crystals	aragonite, gypsum, quartz, plagioclase, staurolite
Hexagonal	Vanadinite / Galena	Hexagonal prism (six-sided)	beryl, galena, quartz, hanksite, vanadinite
Icositetrahedral	Spessartine / Analcime	Icositetrahedron-shaped, 24-faced	analcime, spessartine
Octahedral	Spinel / Fluorite	Octahedron-shaped, square bipyramid (eight-sided)	diamond, fluorine, fluorite, magnetite, pyrite
Prismatic	Beryl / Tourmaline	Elongate, prism-like: may or not present well-developed crystal faces parallel to the vertical axis	beryl, tourmaline, vanadinite
Rhombohedral	Siderite / Rhodochrosite	Rhombohedron-shaped (six-faced rhombi)	calcite, magnesite, rhodochrosite, siderite
Scalenohedral	Calcite / Rhodochrosite	Scalenohedron-shaped, pointy ends	calcite, rhodochrosite, titanite
Tetrahedral	Sphalerite / Tetrahedrite	Tetrahedron-shaped, triangular pyramid (four-sided)	chalcopyrite, tetrahedrite, sphalerite, magnetite

=== Rounded/Spherical habits ===
Habit	Image	Description	Common example(s)
Botryoidal	Chalcedony / Calcite	Grape-like, large and small hemispherical masses, nearly differentiated/separated from each other	calcite, chalcedony, halite, plumbogummite, smithsonite
Globular	Gyrolite / Calcite	Isolated hemispheres or spheres	calcite, fluorite, gyrolite
Mammillary	Chalcedony / Hematite	Breast-like: surface formed by intersecting partial spherical shapes, larger version of botryoidal and/or reniform, also concentric layered aggregates.	chalcedony, hematite, malachite
Reniform	Malachite / Hematite (kidney ore)	Irregular kidney-shaped spherical masses	cassiterite, chalcedony, chrysocolla, hematite, hemimorphite fluorite, goethite, greenockite, malachite, rhodochrosite, smithsonite, mottramite, wavellite

== See also ==
- Abnormal grain growth
- Grain growth
- Crystal structure

== Bibliography ==
- Kostov, Ivan; Kostov, Ruslan I. (1999). Crystal Habits of Minerals. Sofia: Academic Publishing House "Prof. Marin Drinov". ISBN 9789546420602. OCLC 488807766.
