= Chuquihuta Municipality =

Chuquihuta Chuqi Uta
- Municipality
- Location within Bolivia
- Coordinates: 18°38′S 66°20′W
- Country: Bolivia
- Department: Potosí Department
- Province: Rafael Bustillo Province
- Seat: Chuquihuta

Population (2001)
  - Total: 6,658
- Time zone: UTC-4 (BOT)

Chuquihuta Municipality, also Chuquihuta Ayllu Jucumani, is the fourth municipal section of the Rafael Bustillo Province in the Potosí Department in Bolivia. Its seat is Chuquihuta (hispanicized spelling Chuquiuta, Aymara Chuqi Uta, "gold house"). The municipality was created on June 17, 2009. Formerly the area was a canton (Chuquiuta Canton, Chuquihuta Canton) of the Uncía Municipality.

== See also ==
- Jach'a Jawira
