= Llallagua =

Llallagua Llallawa
- Town
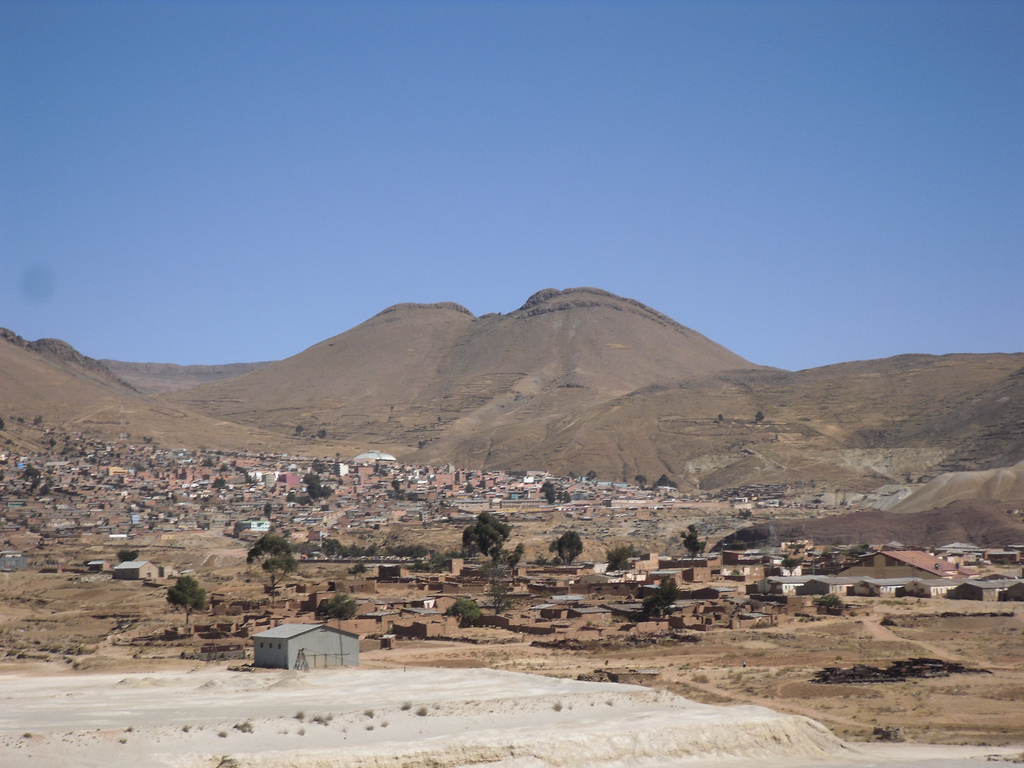

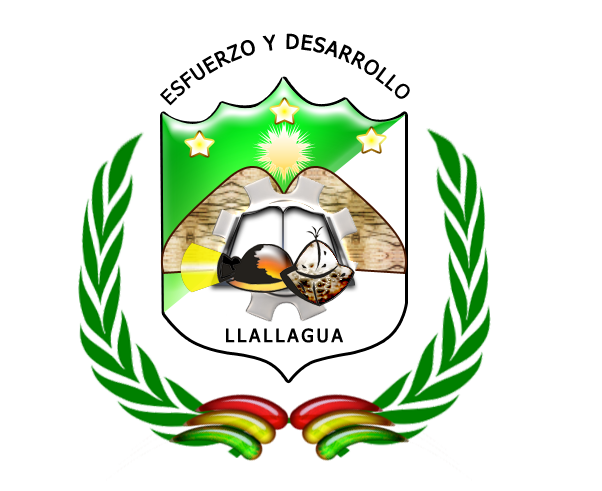
- Seal

- Location within Bolivia
- Coordinates: 18°25′S 66°35′W
- Country: Bolivia
- Department: Potosí Department
- Province: Rafael Bustillo Province
- Municipality: Llallagua Municipality
- Canton: Llallagua Canton

Government
  - Mayor: Tomás Quiróz (Without Fear Movement; elected 2010)
  - President: Maximo Urquieta Mitma (2007)
- Elevation: 12,779 ft (3,895 m)

Population (2001)
  - Total: 20,065
- Time zone: UTC-4 (BOT)

Llallagua (in hispanicized spelling) or Llallawa (Aymara for a monstrous potato (like two potatoes) or animal, Quechua for the god of seed-time during the Inca period) is a town in the Potosí Department in Bolivia. It is the seat of the Llallagua Municipality, the third municipal section of the Rafael Bustillo Province.

== History ==
Llallagua (in its common form) or Llallawa (as it is written in Quechua) is the name given by the indigenous people of the Andes.

== Geography ==
Llallagua features a rare microclimate amidst the semi-arid tundras of Potosí and Oruro, due to its extreme elevation near 4000m. Semi-arid and with average temperatures in its warmest month sitting right on the 11 °C threshold, the city's climate straddles that of the subtropical highland climate (Cwc, according to the Köppen climate classification), with subpolar oceanic characteristics and a cold semi-arid climate (BSk). Summers are cool and wet with daily highs rarely rising above 22 °C, while winters feature cooler days with much colder nights averaging −4 °C. These low temperatures are a result of the extreme precipitation deficit during the winter months with the resulting aridity leading to an increased diurnal temperature variation.

=== Climate ===
Climate data for Llallagua, elevation 3,800 m (12,500 ft)
Month	Jan	Feb	Mar	Apr	May	Jun	Jul	Aug	Sep	Oct	Nov	Dec	Year
Record high °C (°F)	26.2 (79.2)	25.0 (77.0)	23.5 (74.3)	23.0 (73.4)	24.0 (75.2)	21.8 (71.2)	21.0 (69.8)	22.0 (71.6)	23.5 (74.3)	25.5 (77.9)	24.5 (76.1)	24.1 (75.4)	26.2 (79.2)
Mean daily maximum °C (°F)	17.0 (62.6)	17.3 (63.1)	17.6 (63.7)	18.2 (64.8)	16.9 (62.4)	16.6 (61.9)	15.4 (59.7)	17.2 (63.0)	18.1 (64.6)	19.4 (66.9)	20.1 (68.2)	19.1 (66.4)	17.7 (63.9)
Daily mean °C (°F)	11.8 (53.2)	11.8 (53.2)	11.5 (52.7)	10.8 (51.4)	8.5 (47.3)	7.6 (45.7)	7.2 (45.0)	8.5 (47.3)	10.3 (50.5)	11.9 (53.4)	12.8 (55.0)	12.8 (55.0)	10.5 (50.8)
Mean daily minimum °C (°F)	6.6 (43.9)	6.4 (43.5)	5.4 (41.7)	3.3 (37.9)	0.1 (32.2)	−1.3 (29.7)	−1.0 (30.2)	−0.2 (31.6)	2.6 (36.7)	4.5 (40.1)	5.6 (42.1)	6.6 (43.9)	3.2 (37.8)
Record low °C (°F)	2.2 (36.0)	3.0 (37.4)	1.0 (33.8)	−2.0 (28.4)	−5.0 (23.0)	−8.4 (16.9)	−6.0 (21.2)	−5.2 (22.6)	−2.6 (27.3)	0.0 (32.0)	2.0 (35.6)	2.5 (36.5)	−8.4 (16.9)
Average precipitation mm (inches)	170.1 (6.70)	105.1 (4.14)	86.4 (3.40)	22.6 (0.89)	2.8 (0.11)	0.0 (0.0)	5.7 (0.22)	4.1 (0.16)	13.3 (0.52)	25.5 (1.00)	43.8 (1.72)	95.5 (3.76)	574.9 (22.62)
Average precipitation days	20.2	15.5	13.0	5.0	0.9	0.0	1.9	1.8	3.1	5.2	8.0	14.8	89.4
Source: Servicio Nacional de Meteorología e Hidrología de Bolivia

== Gallery ==
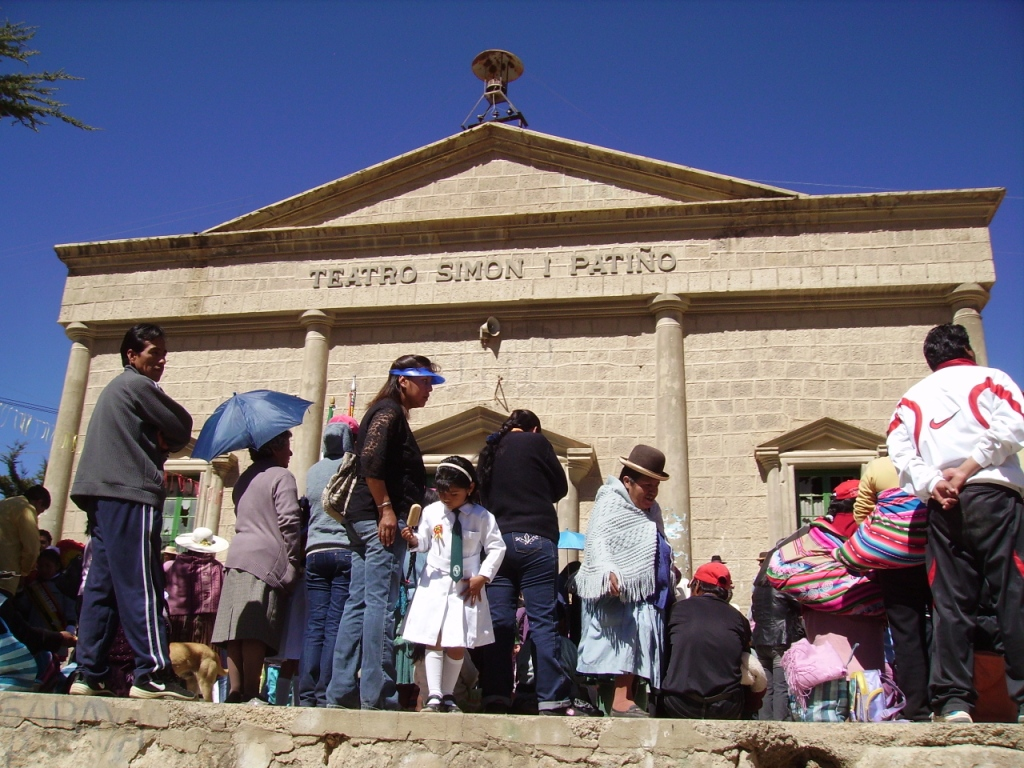
Simon I Patiño Theatre

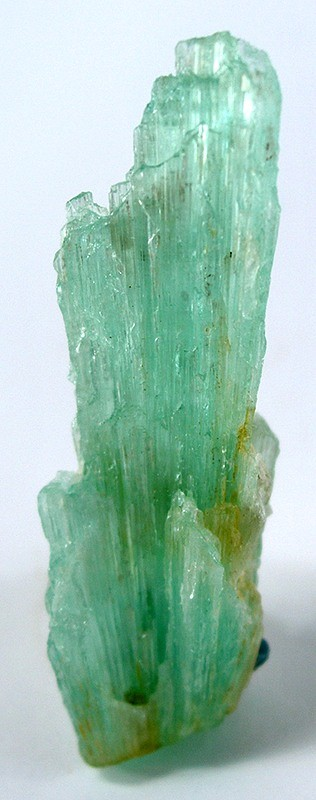
Metavauxite, a rare member of the vauxite group. Siglo XX Mine, Llallagua, Bolivia. Size: 4.2 x 1.2 x 1.1 cm.
