= Uncía =

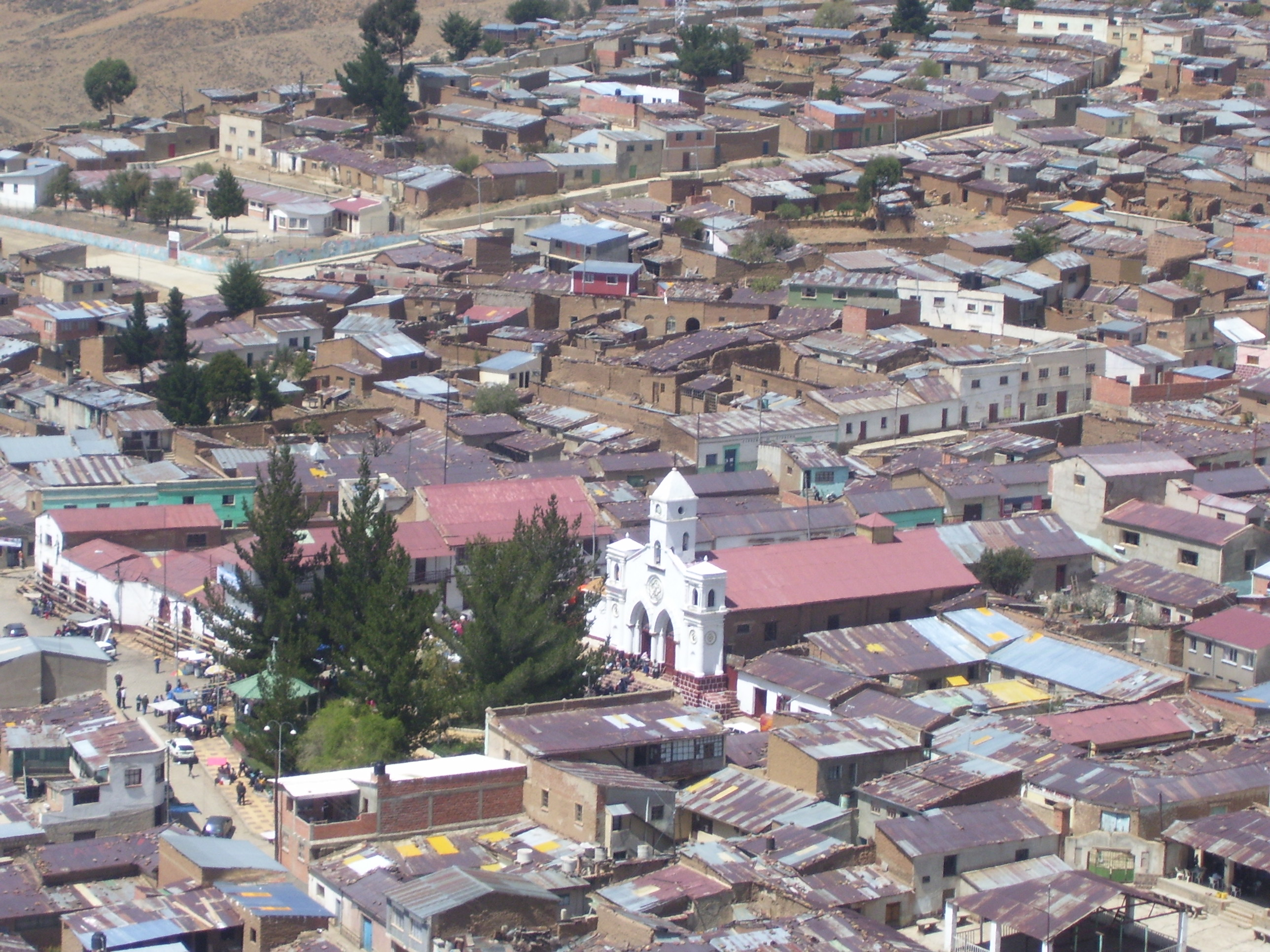

- Location in Bolivia
- Coordinates: 18°28′5″S 66°33′53″W
- Country: Bolivia
- Department: Potosí Department
- Province: Rafael Bustillo Province
- Municipality: Uncía Municipality
- Canton: Uncía Canton
- Elevation: 12,687 ft (3,867 m)

Population (2012)
  - Total: 8,902
- Time zone: UTC-4 (BOT)

Uncía is a town located in the Potosí Department of Bolivia. It is the capital of the Uncía Municipality and Rafael Bustillo Province.
