= Romanèchite =

Baryum manganese oxide mineral

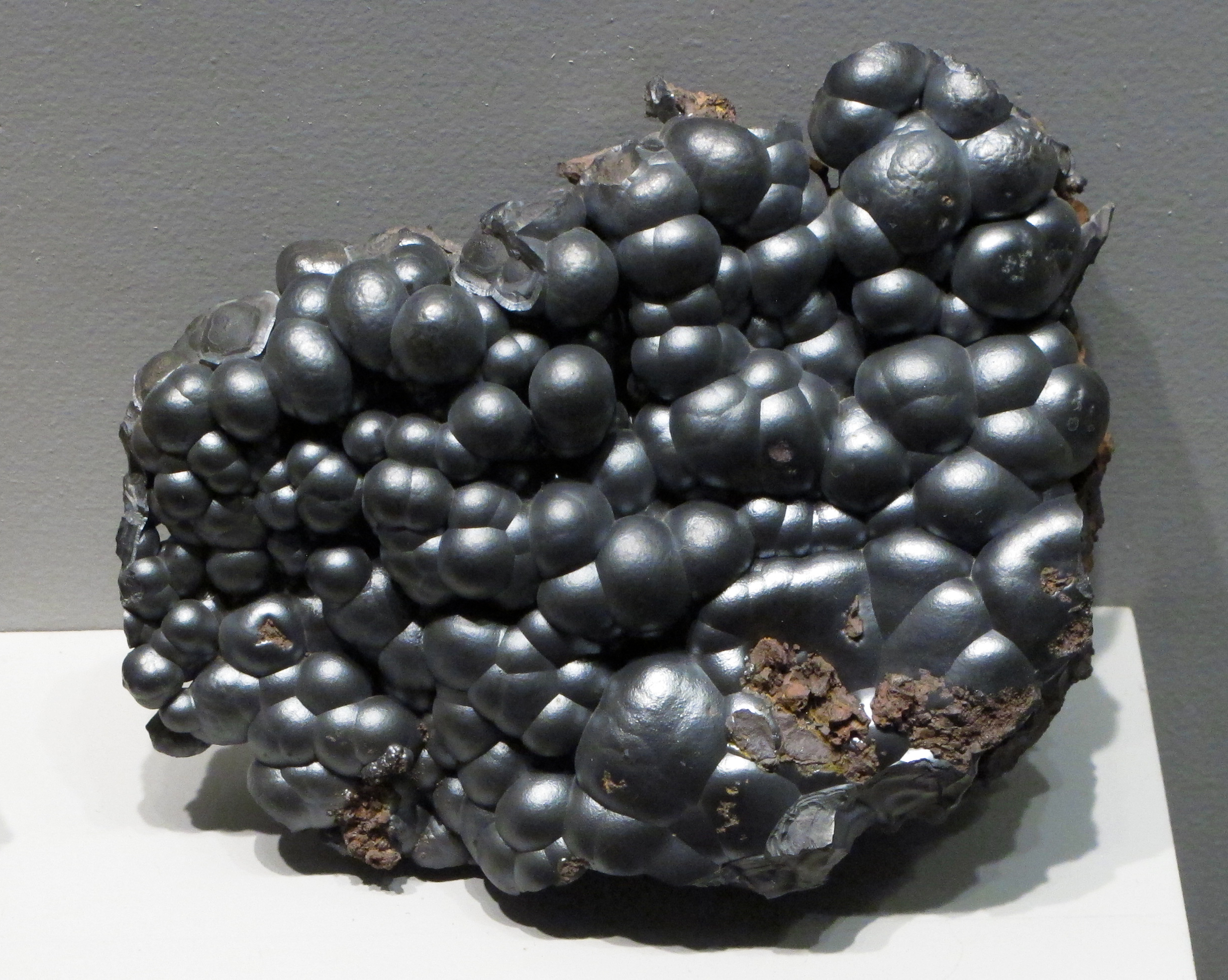
- Romanèchite, from the Marquette County, Michigan, US.

General
- Category: Oxide minerals
- Formula: (Ba,H_{2}O)_{2}(Mn^{4+},Mn^{3+})_{5}O_{10}
- IMA symbol: Rmn
- Strunz classification: 4.DK.10
- Crystal system: Monoclinic
- Crystal class: Prismatic (2/m) (same H-M symbol)
- Space group: C2/m

Identification
- Mohs scale hardness: 6–6.5
- Luster: Submetallic
- Streak: Blue-black

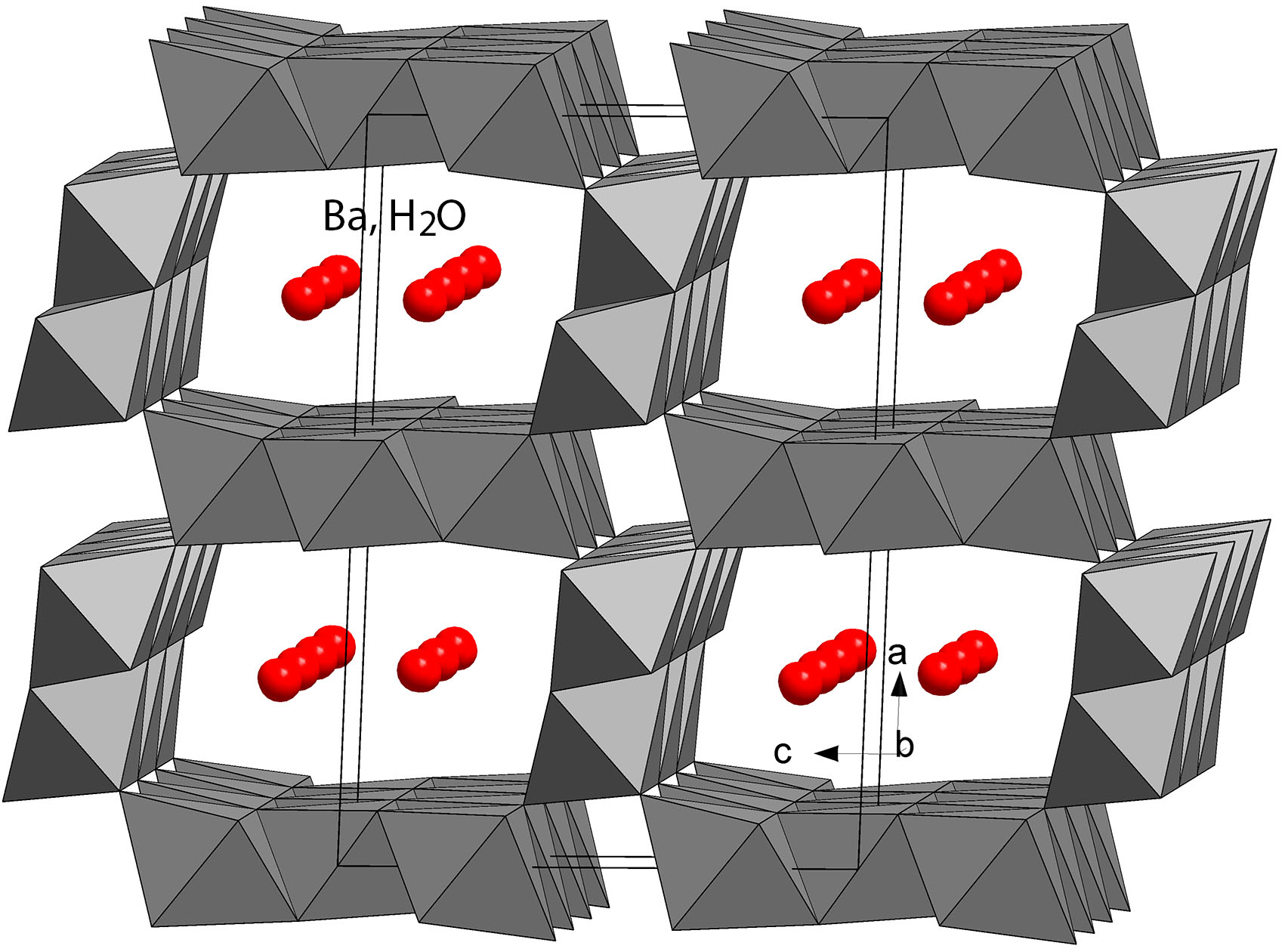
Polyhedral representation of the 2 x 3 tunnel structure of romanèchite. The red atoms represent Ba and H_{2}O.

Romanèchite ((Ba,H_{2}O)_{2}(Mn^{4+},Mn^{3+})_{5}O_{10}) is the primary constituent of psilomelane, which is a mixture of minerals. Most psilomelane is not pure romanechite, so it is incorrect to consider them synonyms. Romanèchite is a valuable ore of manganese, which is used in steelmaking and sodium battery production. It has a monoclinic crystal structure, a hardness of 6 and a specific gravity of 4.7–5. Romanèchite's structure consists of 2 × 3 tunnels formed by MnO_{6} octahedra.

It is commonly associated with hematite, barite, pyrolusite, quartz and other manganese oxide minerals. It has been found in France, Germany, England, Brazil, Russia, India, and various parts of the United States, including Arizona, Virginia, Tennessee and Michigan, and sites throughout the Appalachian Valley and Ridge. It occurs also in ferromanganese nodules from Lake Baikal.

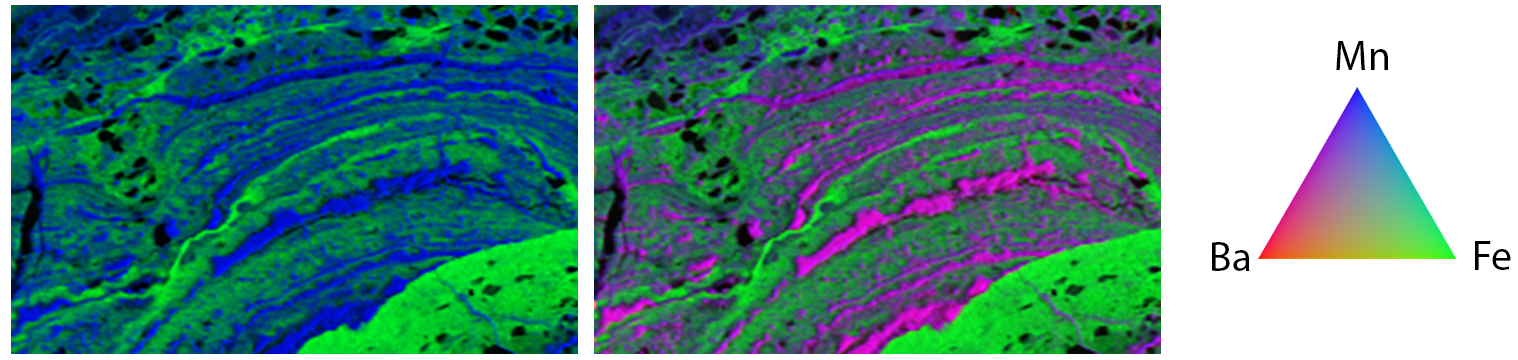
Bicolor (left) and tricolor (right) X-ray fluorescence maps of the distribution of Mn, Fe, and Ba in a ferromanganese nodule from Lake Baikal. Size = 5 mm (H) × 3 mm (V).
