= Rafael Bustillo Province =

Rafael Bustillo
- Province
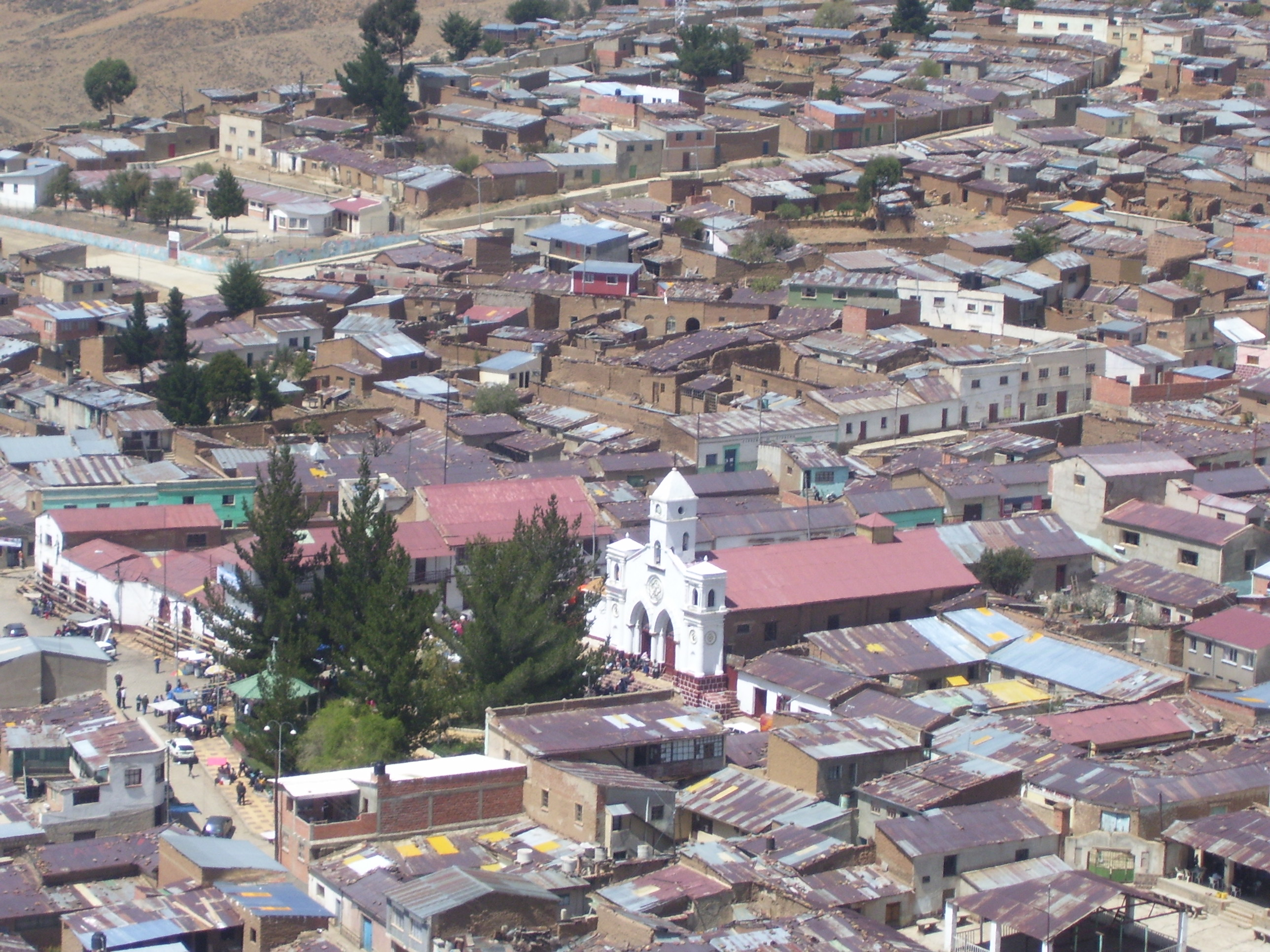
- Uncía, the capital of the province

- Flag Seal

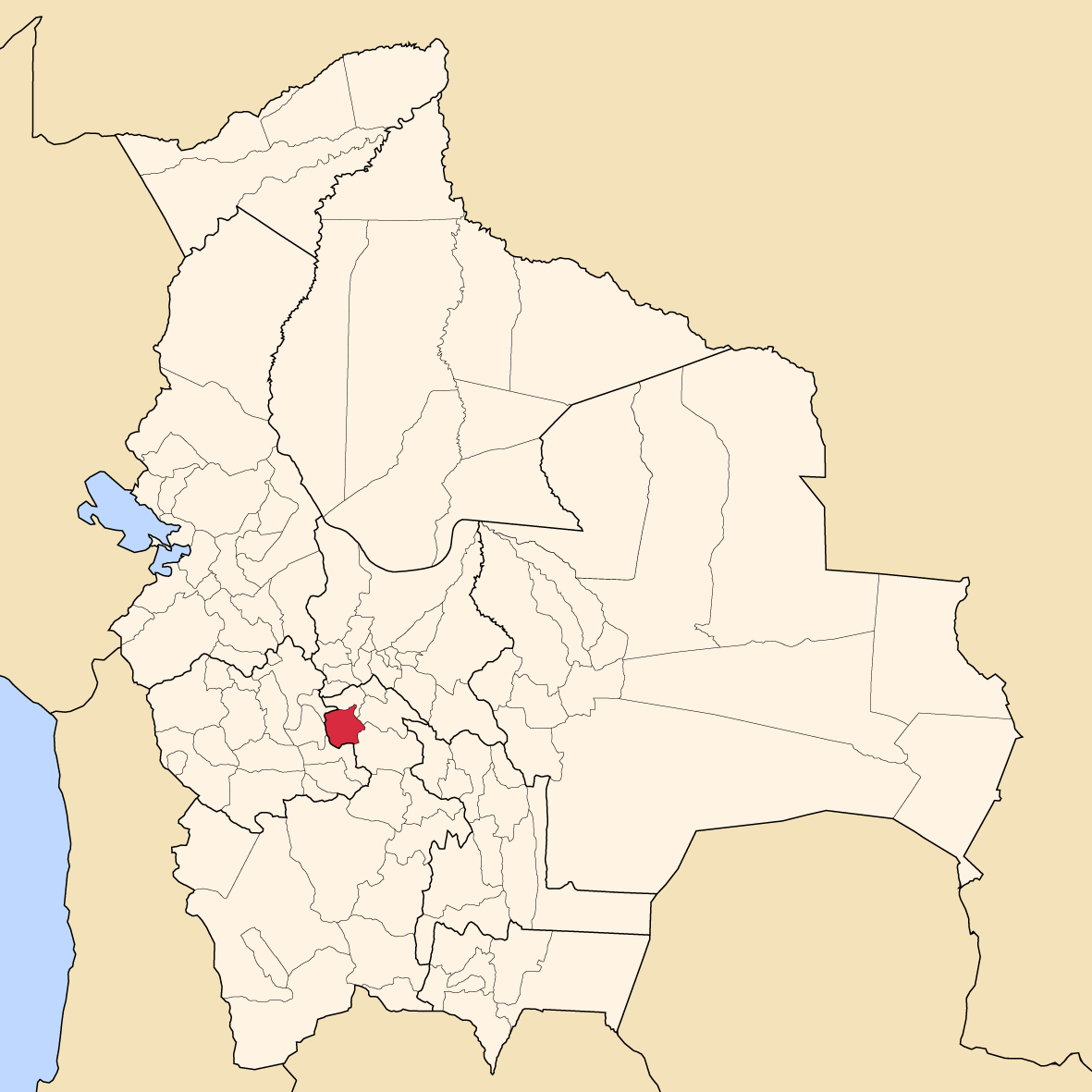
- Location of the Rafael Bustillo Province within Bolivia

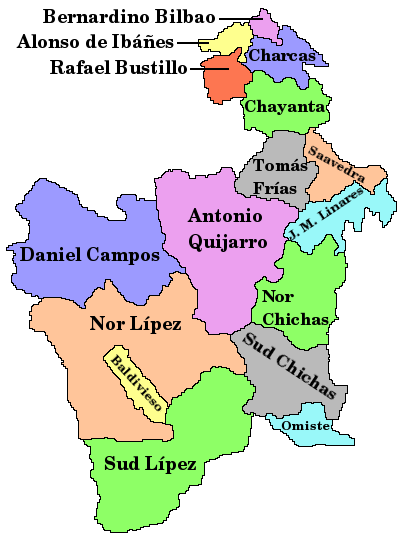
- Provinces of the Potosí Department
- Coordinates: 18°28′0″S 66°28′0″W
- Country: Bolivia
- Department: Potosí Department
- Capital: Uncía

Area
  - Total: 868 sq mi (2,249 km^{2})

Population (2024 census)
  - Total: 88,422
  - Density: 101.8/sq mi (39.32/km^{2})
  - Ethnicities: Quechua Aymara
- Time zone: UTC-4 (BOT)
- Area code: BO.PO.RB

Rafael Bustillo is a province in the Bolivian Potosí Department. Its name honors the Bolivian diplomat and foreign secretary Rafael Bustillo († 1886). The capital of the province is Uncía with a population of 5,709 in the year 2001, the largest town is Llallagua with 20,065 inhabitants.

== Location ==
Rafael Bustillo province is one of sixteen provinces in the Potosí Department. It is located between 18° 11' and 18° 45' South and between 66° 11' and 66° 45' West. It borders Oruro Department in the northwest, west and south, Chayanta Province in the southeast, Charcas Province in the east, and Alonso de Ibáñez Province in the northeast. The province extends over 70 km from north to south as well as from east to west.

== Division ==
The province comprises four municipalities which are further subdivided into cantons.

Section	Municipality	Seat
1st	Uncía Municipality	Uncía
2nd	Chayanta Municipality	Chayanta
3rd	Llallagua Municipality	Llallagua
4th	Chuquihuta Municipality	Chuquihuta

Chuquihuta Municipality was created by law on June 17, 2009. Until then it was one of the cantons of the Uncía Municipality.

== Population ==
The main language of the province is Quechua, spoken by 86%, while 74% of the population speak Spanish. The population increased from 76,254 inhabitants (1992 census) to 77,566 (2001 census), an increase of 1.7%.

46% of the population have no access to electricity, 78% have no sanitary facilities. 41% of the population are employed in agriculture, 11% in mining, 11% in industry, 37% in general services. 90.5% of the population are Catholics, 6.7% Protestants.

The people are predominantly indigenous citizens of Quechua and Aymara descent.

Ethnic group	Uncía and Chuquihuta Municipality (%)	Chayanta Municipality (%)	Llallagua Municipality (%)
Quechua	69,1	87,8	71,6
Aymara	20,0	9,8	12,8
Guaraní, Chiquitos, Moxos	0,0	0,0	0,3
Not indigenous	10,9	2,2	15,1
Other indigenous groups	0,0	0,1	0,2
