= Wavellite =

Aluminium phosphate basic hydrate mineral

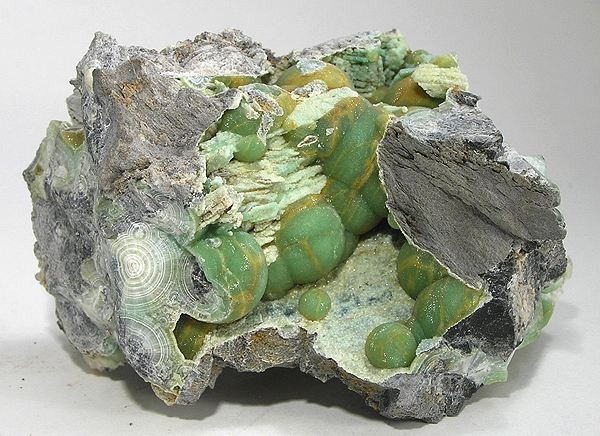
- Wavellite cluster from Mauldin Mountain Quarries, Mauldin Mt., Montgomery County, Arkansas

General
- Category: Phosphate minerals
- Formula: Al_{3}(PO_{4})_{2}(OH,F)_{3}·5H_{2}O
- IMA symbol: Wav
- Strunz classification: 8.DC.50
- Crystal system: Orthorhombic
- Crystal class: Dipyramidal (mmm); H-M symbol: (2/m 2/m 2/m)
- Space group: Pcmn
- Unit cell: a = 9.621 Å b = 17.363 Å, c = 6.994 Å; Z = 4

Identification
- Color: Green to yellowish-green and greenish blue and blue. and yellow, brown, white and colorless
- Crystal habit: Spherical, radial aggregates; striated prisms; crusty to stalactitic
- Cleavage: [110] perfect, [101] good, [010] distinct
- Fracture: Uneven to subconchoidal
- Mohs scale hardness: 3.5 - 4
- Luster: Vitreous to resinous, pearly
- Streak: White
- Diaphaneity: Translucent
- Specific gravity: 2.36
- Optical properties: Biaxial (+)
- Refractive index: n_{α} = 1.518 - 1.535 n_{β} = 1.524 - 1.543 n_{γ} = 1.544 - 1.561
- Birefringence: δ = 0.026
- Pleochroism: Weak; X = greenish; Z = yellowish
- 2V angle: Measured: 60° to 72°
- Fusibility: Infusable, swells and splits on heating
- Solubility: Insoluble

Wavellite is an aluminium basic phosphate mineral with formula Al_{3}(PO_{4})_{2}(OH, F)_{3}·5H_{2}O. Distinct crystals are rare, and it normally occurs as translucent green radial or spherical clusters.

== Discovery and occurrence ==
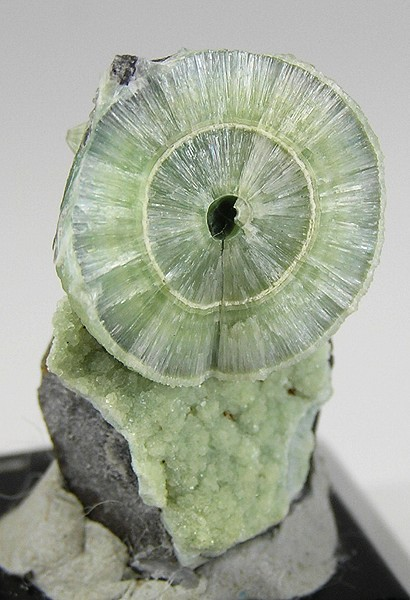
Wavellite from the Avant Mine, Garland County, Arkansas, showing spherical structure (size: 3.4 x 2.0 x 1.1 cm)

Wavellite was first described in 1805 for an occurrence at High Down, Filleigh, Devon, England and named by William Babington in 1805 in honor of Dr. William Wavell (1750–1829), a Devon-based physician, botanist, historian, and naturalist, who brought the mineral to the attention of fellow mineralogists.

It occurs in association with crandallite and variscite in fractures in aluminous metamorphic rock, in hydrothermal regions and in phosphate rock deposits. It is found in a wide variety of locations, notably in the Mount Ida, Arkansas area in the Ouachita Mountains.

It is sometimes used as a gemstone.

== See also ==
- List of minerals
- Apatite, fluoro-phosphate of calcium
- Pyromorphite, chloro-phosphate of lead
- Turquoise, a hydrated phosphate of copper and aluminium
