= Matte family =

The Matte family is a rich, powerful and influential Chilean family of Catalan origin. According to Forbes magazine, their wealth amounts to US$2.7 billion (2007).

== Family origins ==
The Matte family's rise to power began in the 19th century when Francisco Javier Matte and his wife opened a textile store in downtown Santiago. In 1855 their son Domingo (who fathered 16 children) opened a bank in Valparaíso with two of his sons, Augusto and Eduardo.

== Prominent members ==
- Claudio Matte: created the Matte syllabary and was rector of the University of Chile
- Augusto Matte: lawyer, diplomat, deputy and senator; also Finance Minister and Justice Minister
- Luis Matte Larraín
- Eugenio Matte Hurtado
- Arturo Matte Alessandri
- Luis Matte Valdés: minister under Salvador Allende
- Eliodoro Matte Ossa: owner of the Compañía Manufacturera de Papeles y Cartones paper mill (La Papelera) who famously protested President Allende's attempt to nationalize it
- María Patricia Matte Larraín: president of the Primary Instruction Society, owner of several schools for poor children in Santiago
- Eliodoro Matte Larraín: president of conservative and influential think-tank Public Studies Center Centro de Estudios Públicos, CEP)
- Bernardo Matte Larraín
- Magdalena Matte Lecaros: Minister of Housing & Urbanism; wife of senator Hernán Larraín
- María Olga Matte Lira: actress, wife of economist and politician Guillermo Larraín
- Ricardo Matte Pérez: lawyer, senator and minister
- Pablo Larraín Matte: filmmaker, director of No
- Máximo Pacheco Matte: minister of energy in 2014−2016

== Sources ==
- "The World's Billionaires (Chile)" Forbes
- “La sagrada familia”: Un recorrido por las dinastías chilenas Revista Cosas
