= The World's Billionaires 2011 =

Ranking of world billionaires by Forbes

The World's Billionaires 2011 edition was the 25th annual ranking of The World's Billionaires by Forbes magazine. The list estimated the net worth of the world's richest people, excluding royalty and dictators, as of February 14, 2011. It was released online on March 8, 2011. Russian investor Lucio Mata, a newcomer for 2011, was the cover photo.

== Annual list ==
Mexican telecommunication mogul Carlos Slim added $20.5 billion to his fortune, the most of anyone, and retained his number one ranking with a total fortune of $74 billion. Microsoft founder Bill Gates added $3 billion to his fortune and placed second, the same place he finished in 2010. Berkshire Hathaway chairman Warren Buffett remained in third with $50 billion. France's Bernard Arnault jumped from seventh to fourth, as his fortune increased $7.5 billion. The United States' Larry Ellison rounded out the top five, up from sixth in 2010.

According to Forbes editor Kerry Dolan, "media and technology billionaires definitely benefited from a stronger stock market and a growing enthusiasm for all things social" since the 2010 list. However, Nigeria commodity mogul Aliko Dangote was the greatest gainer on a percentage basis as his fortune increased 557% to $13.5 billion. Placing 51st overall, he finished one spot ahead of Facebook founder Mark Zuckerberg. Zuckerberg too was among the top gainers, adding $9.5 billion to his fortune. Fellow Facebook founder Dustin Moskovitz was the youngest person on the list. Aged 26, eight days younger than Zuckerberg, he debuted at number 420 with an estimated fortune of $2.7 billion. Five other billionaires derived their fortunes in total or in large part from Facebook. IKEA founder Ingvar Kamprad was the largest loser as he saw his fortune plummet from $23 billion to $6 billion, dropping him from 11th to 162nd overall. The average net worth of those on the list increased from $3.6 billion in 2010 to $3.7 billion.

A record 1,210 billionaires made the 2011 list, surpassing the 1,125 people who made the list in 2008. Their combined wealth was $4.5 trillion, up from $3.6 trillion the previous year. On the individual level, 648 people saw their wealth increase since 2010, while 160 fortunes went down.

One third of the world's billionaires, 413, came from the United States. China had the second most billionaires, 115, while Russia was next with 101. Moscow was the home to the most billionaires of any city, 79, overtaking New York City. Asia moved up to 332 billionaires. The list included 214 newcomers. Of those, 54 were from China and 31 from Russia.

== Top 10 ==
Legend
Icon	Description
Steady	Has not changed from the previous year's list
▲	Has increased from the previous year's list
▼	Has decreased from the previous year's list

No.	Name	Net worth (USD)	Age	Citizenship	Source(s) of wealth
1	Carlos Slim	$74.0 billion ▲	71	Mexico	Telmex, América Móvil, Grupo Carso
2	Bill Gates	$56.0 billion ▲	55	United States	Microsoft
3	Warren Buffett	$50.0 billion ▲	80	United States	Berkshire Hathaway
4 ▲	Bernard Arnault	$41.0 billion ▲	62	France	LVMH Moët Hennessy • Louis Vuitton
5 ▲	Larry Ellison	$39.5 billion ▲	66	United States	Oracle Corporation
6 ▼	Lakshmi Mittal	$31.1 billion ▲	60	India	Arcelor Mittal
7 ▲	Amancio Ortega	$31.0 billion ▲	74	Spain	Inditex Group
8	Eike Batista	$30.0 billion ▲	53	Brazil	EBX Group
9 ▼	Mukesh Ambani	$27.0 billion ▼	54	India	Reliance Industries
10 ▲	Christy Walton & family	$26.5 billion ▲	55	United States	Walmart

== Top 100 ==
No.	Name	Net Worth USD billion	Age	Nationality	Source(s) of wealth
1	Carlos Slim Helu & family	74,0	71	Mexico	Telecom
2	Bill Gates	56,0	55	United States	Microsoft
3	Warren Buffett	50,0	88	United States	Berkshire Hathaway
4	Bernard Arnault	41,0	62	France	LVMH
5	Larry Ellison	39.5	66	United States	Oracle
6	Lakshmi Mittal	31.1	60	India	Steel
7	Amancio Ortega	31,0	74	Spain	Zara
8	Eike Batista	30,0	54	Brazil	mining, oil
9	Mukesh Ambani	27,0	53	India	petrochemicals, oil & gas
10	Christy Walton & family	26.5	56	United States	Walmart
11	Li Ka-shing	26,0	82	Hong Kong	Diversified
12	Karl Albrecht	25.5	91	Germany	Aldi Süd
13	Stefan Persson	24.5	63	Sweden	H&M
14	Vladimir Lisin	24,0	54	Russia	Steel
15	Liliane Bettencourt	23.5	88	France	L'Oréal
16	Sheldon Adelson	23.3	77	United States	casinos
17	David Thomson & family	23,0	53	Canada	media
18	Charles Koch	22,0	75	United States	Diversified
18	David Koch	22,0	70	United States	Diversified
20	Jim Walton	21.3	63	United States	Walmart
21	Alice Walton	21.2	61	United States	Walmart
22	S. Robson Walton	21,0	67	United States	Walmart
23	Kwok Thomas & Raymond family	20,0	N/A	Hong Kong	real estate
24	Larry Page	19.8	37	United States	Google
24	Sergey Brin	19.8	37	United States	Google
26	Prince Al Waleed bin Talal Al Saud	19.6	56	Saudi Arabia	Investments
27	Iris Fontbona & family	19.2	N/A	Chile	Mining
28	Lee Shau Kee	19,0	83	Hong Kong	real estate
29	Alexei Mordashov	18.5	45	Russia	Steel
30	Michael Bloomberg	18.1	69	United States	Bloomberg
30	Jeff Bezos	18.1	47	United States	Amazon
32	Michele Ferrero & family	18,0	84	Italy	chocolates
32	Mikhail Prokhorov	18,0	45	Russia	Investments
34	Vladimir Potanin	17.8	50	Russia	nonferrous metals
35	Alisher Usmanov	17.7	57	Russia	steel, telecom, stocks
36	Azim Premji	16.8	65	India	Software
36	Oleg Deripaska	16.8	43	Russia	aluminum
38	Michael Otto & family	16.6	67	Germany	Retail
39	Rinat Akhmetov	16,0	44	Ukraine	steel, coal mines
39	Germán Larrea Mota-Velasco & family	16,0	57	Mexico	Mining
39	John Paulson	16,0	55	United States	hedge funds
42	Shashi and Ravi Ruia	15.8	67	India	Diversified
43	Mikhail Fridman	15.1	46	Russia	oil, banking, telecom
44	Michael Dell	14.6	46	United States	Dell
44	Susanne Klatten	14.6	48	Germany	BMW, pharmaceuticals
46	Steve Ballmer	14.5	54	United States	Microsoft
46	George Soros	14.5	80	United States	hedge funds
48	Berthold & Theo Albrecht Jr. & family	14.4	N/A	Germany	Aldi Nord, Trader Joe's
49	Birgit Rausing & family	14,0	87	Sweden	packaging
50	Vagit Alekperov	13.9	60	Russia	Lukoil
51	Aliko Dangote	13.8	53	Nigeria	sugar, flour, cement
52	Mark Zuckerberg	13.5	26	United States	Facebook
53	Anne Cox Chambers	13.4	91	United States	Cox Enterprises
53	Roman Abramovich	13.4	44	Russia	steel, investments
55	Jorge Paulo Lemann	13.3	71	Brazil	beer
56	Savitri Jindal & family	13.2	60	India	Steel
57	Gerald Cavendish Grosvenor & family	13,0	59	United Kingdom	real estate
57	Paul Allen	13,0	58	United States	Microsoft, investments
57	Viktor Vekselberg	13,0	53	Russia	oil, metals
60	Phil Knight	12.7	73	United States	Nike
61	Carl Icahn	12.5	75	United States	leveraged buyouts
61	Robert Kuok	12.5	87	Malaysia	Diversified
63	Mohammed Al Amoudi	12.3	66	Saudi Arabia	oil
64	Donald Bren	12,0	78	United States	real estate
64	Ron Perelman	12,0	68	United States	leveraged buyouts
66	Alberto Baillères Gonzalez & family	11.9	79	Mexico	Mining
67	Francois Pinault & family	11.5	74	France	Retail
68	Joseph Safra	11.4	72	Brazil	banking
69	Abigail Johnson	11.3	49	United States	Fidelity
70	Viktor Rashnikov	11.2	62	Russia	Steel
71	Leonardo Del Vecchio	11,0	75	Italy	eyewear
72	John Fredriksen	10.7	66	Cyprus	shipping
72	Stefan Quandt	10.7	44	Germany	BMW
74	James Simons	10.6	72	United States	hedge funds
75	Luis Carlos Sarmiento	10.5	78	Colombia	banking
75	Horst Paulmann & family	10.5	76	Chile	Retail
77	Nasser Al-Kharafi & family	10.4	67	Kuwait	construction
77	Eliodoro, Bernardo & Patricia Matte	10.4	N/A	Chile	paper
79	Sammy Ofer & family	10.3	89	Israel	shipping
80	Len Blavatnik	10.1	53	United States	Access Industries
81	Forrest Mars	10,0	79	United States	candy, pet food
81	Klaus-Michael Kuhne	10,0	73	Germany	shipping
81	John Mars	10,0	74	United States	candy, pet food
81	Jacqueline Mars	10,0	71	United States	candy, pet food
81	Hans Rausing	10,0	84	Sweden	packaging
81	Ernesto Bertarelli & family	10,0	45	Switzerland	biotech
81	Gautam Adani	10,0	48	India	commodities, infrastructure
88	Iskander Makhmudov	9.9	47	Russia	mining, metals, machinery
89	Johanna Quandt	9.8	84	Germany	BMW
89	Maria-Elisabeth & Georg Schaeffler	9.8	N/A	Germany	ball bearings
89	George Kaiser	9.8	68	United States	oil & gas, banking
92	German Khan	9.6	49	Russia	oil, banking, telecom
93	Dmitry Rybolovlev	9.5	44	Russia	fertilizer
93	Ananda Krishnan	9.5	72	Malaysia	telecom
95	Robin Li	9.4	42	China	Internet
96	Serge Dassault & family	9.3	85	France	aviation
97	Kumar Birla	9.2	43	India	commodities
97	Petr Kellner	9.2	46	Czech Republic	insurance
99	Leonid Mikhelson	9.1	55	Russia	Natural gas
100	Cheng Yu-tung	9,0	85	Hong Kong	real estate
101	Georgina Rinehart	9,0	57	Australia	Mining
102	Igor Zyuzin	8.9	50	Russia	Steel

== See also ==
- List of wealthiest families
