= Delia Matte Pérez =

Chilean feminist

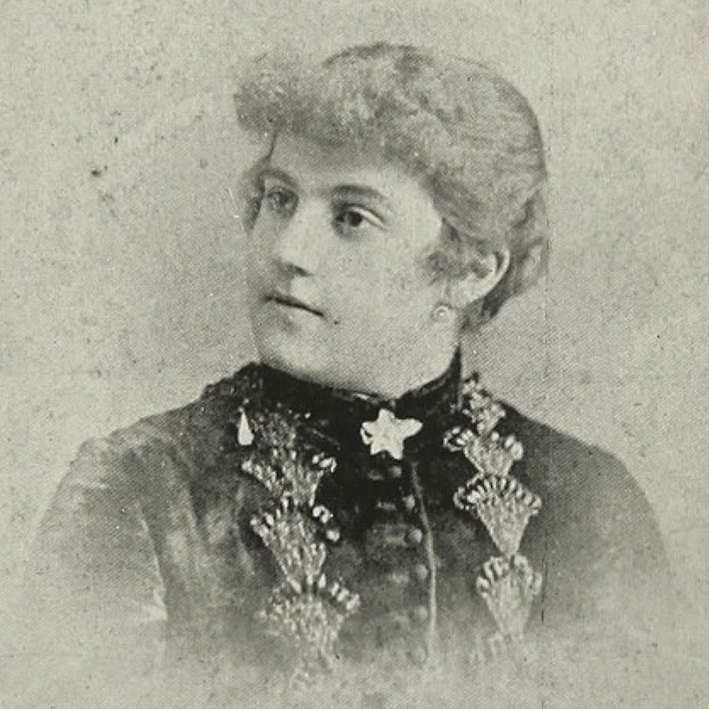
- President
- Born: 1886
- Died: 1941 (aged 54–55)
- Known for: co-founded Club de Señoras ("Ladies' Club")
- Spouse: Salvador Izquierdo

Delia Matte Pérez (1886 – 1941) was a Chilean feminist in the early 20th century.

== Early life ==
She was born into the notable aristocratic Matte family, the daughter of Domingo Matte Messiah, merchant and banker, and Rosalia Perez Vargas. She was one of thirteen children brought up in a financially comfortable and liberal family. She married Salvador Izquierdo and had five children: Salvador, Raul, Delia, Rachel and Augusto. She was the sister of Claudio Matte, Augusto Matte, and Ricardo Matte Pérez.

== Women's rights ==
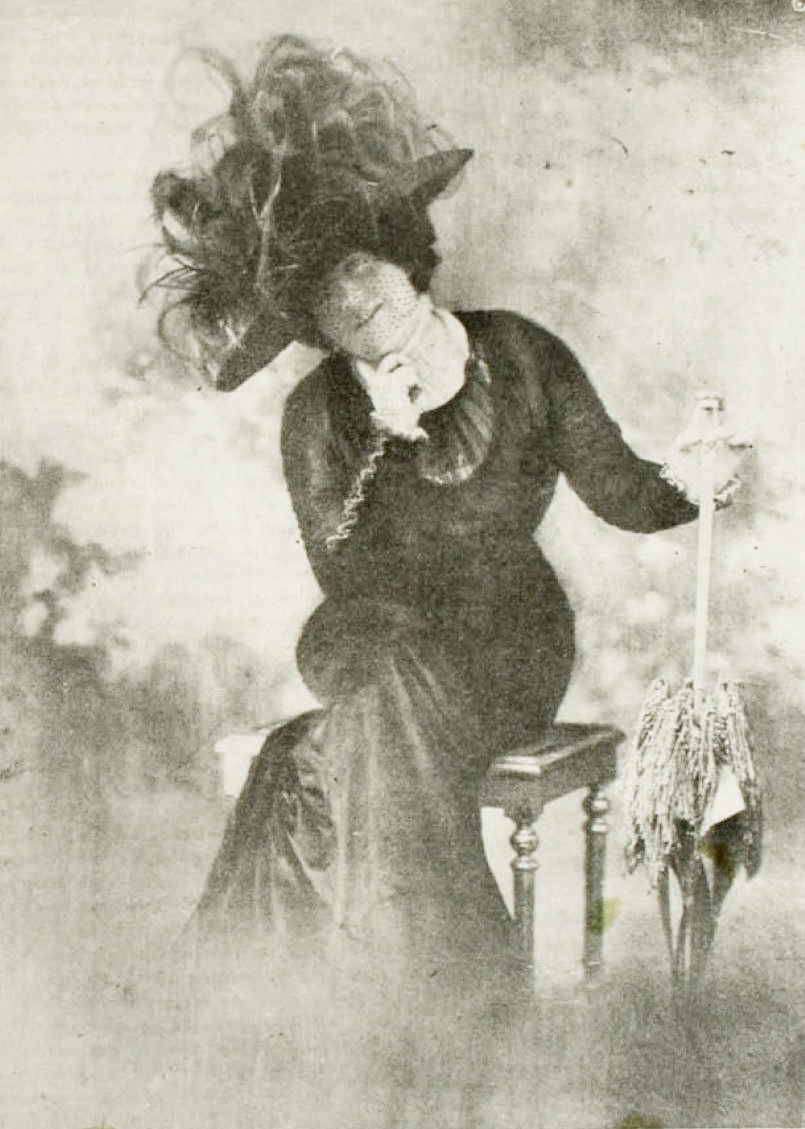
Delia Matte

She co-founded Club de Señoras ("Ladies' Club") in 1916 with Iris, Martina Barros Borgoño, and Luisa LynchIt initiated the struggle for the emancipation of women and created the first bill to grant citizenship rights to Chilean women. The club was located between Morandé and Teatinos in Company Street. It was originally intended to be merely a social gathering of upper class women, but once formed the membership's interest turn to politics. The club was an autonomous offshoot of the church and the members organised instruction in art and history as well as presenting music and presentations by leading intellectuals. Some believe that the club was spurred into self education because middle class educated women were arriving in Chilean society highlighting how-ill informed privileged women were.

Perez defended different types of feminism, feminism that "awakens in the woman the right to study... the right to draw on all the skills that make an effective culture and also the right to establish personality, a feminism that is almost equivalent to the simple and important concept of being, because who is not perceived individually different between the human community has no right to be". in 1917 the club's lobbying led to the first realisation of women's civil rights in Chile.

== Gallery ==
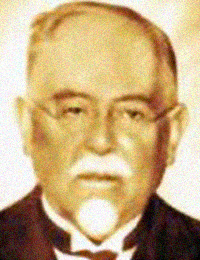
Claudio Matte Perez

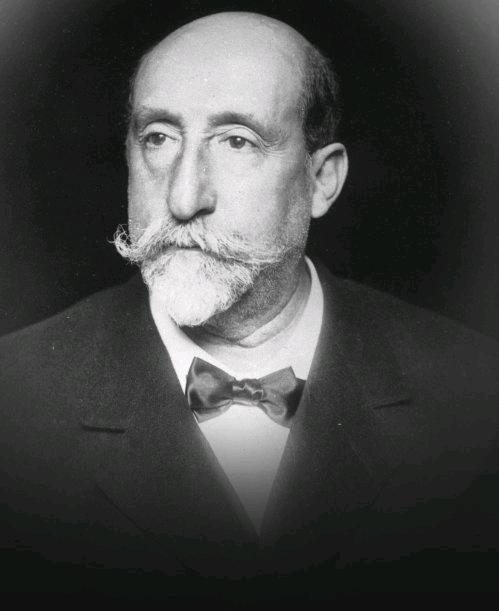
Augusto Matte Pérez

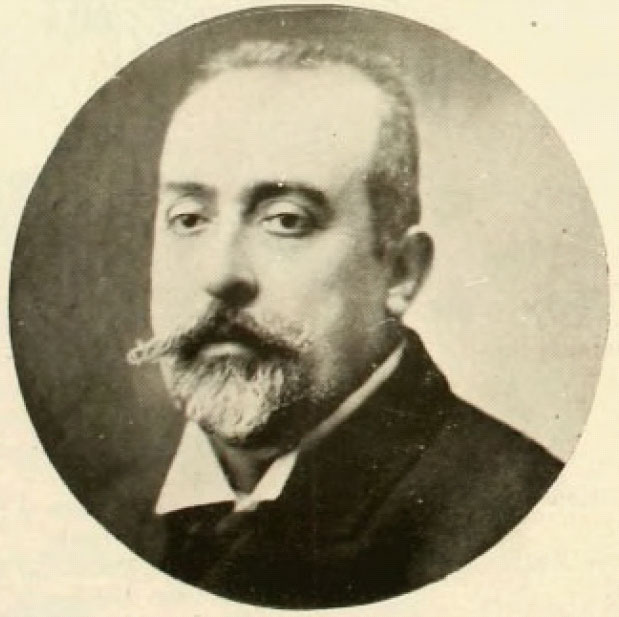
Ricardo Matte Pérez
