= Patricia Poblete =

Chilean politician (1946–2022)

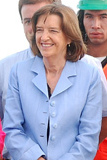

Minister of Housing & Urbanism
- In office 11 March 2006 – 11 March 2010
- President: Michelle Bachelet
- Preceded by: Sonia Tschorne
- Succeeded by: Magdalena Matte

Personal details
- Born: 6 June 1946 Temuco, Chile
- Died: 31 March 2022 (aged 75) Santiago, Chile
- Party: Christian Democratic
- Spouse: Jorge Navarrete
- Children: Four
- Education: University of Chile (B.Sc)
- Occupation: Politician
- Profession: Economist

Patricia Poblete Benett (6 June 1946 − 31 March 2022) was a Chilean economist who served as minister during the first government of Michelle Bachelet (2006–2010).

== Family and education ==
In the mid-1960s, she moved from her hometown to Santiago to study economics at the University of Chile.

While studying there, she joined the Christian Democratic Party of Chile and met Jorge Navarrete Martínez, then president of the University of Chile Student Federation (FECh), whom she later married. The couple had four children (three sons and one daughter), including lawyer and political analyst Jorge Navarrete Poblete.

== Public career ==
During the military dictatorship of General Augusto Pinochet (1973–1990), she worked for the Hogar de Cristo, a charitable institution affiliated with the Society of Jesus, and later for the Women's Committee for Free Elections.

Following the return to democracy, she worked for the Municipality of Santiago between 1990 and 2000 under Mayor Jaime Ravinet, serving as Municipal Services Coordinator and later as Ravinet's chief of staff.

In 2000, during the final months of the administration of Eduardo Frei Ruiz-Tagle, she was appointed Executive Director of Fundación Integra. In that position, which she retained throughout the administration of Ricardo Lagos (2000–2006), she coordinated the curricular reform implemented in the country's 900 poorest preschool centers.

She was appointed Minister of Housing & Urbanism by President Michelle Bachelet on 11 March 2006 and remained in office until the end of the administration on 11 March 2010.

In March 2014, during the second Bachelet administration, President Bachelet appointed her Coordinator of the Program Management Unit, a position she held until her resignation in December 2015.
