= Banco BICE =

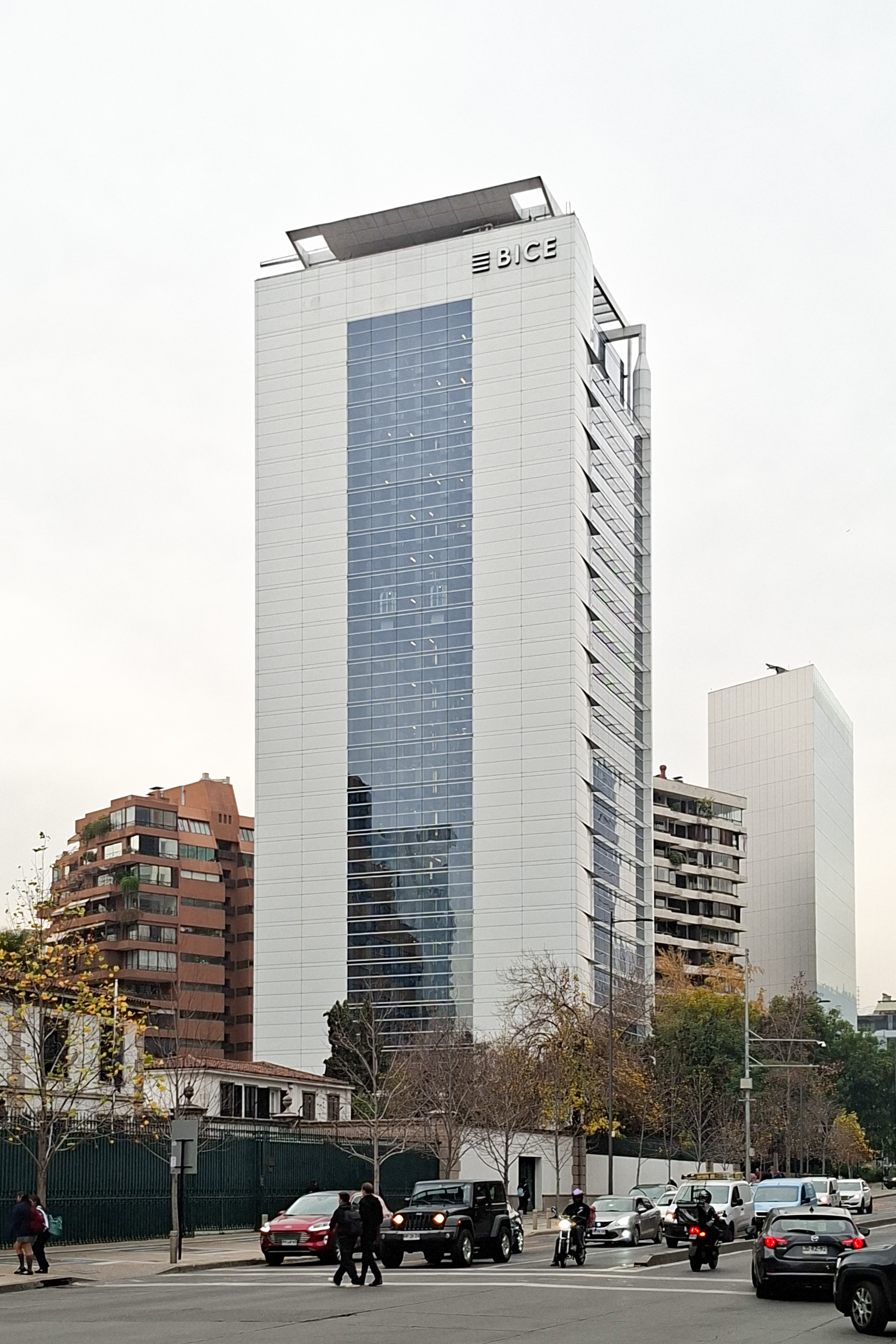
Headquarters of the bank in Santiago de Chile

Banco BICE (Banco Industrial y de Comercio Exterior) is a Chilean bank. It was founded in 1979, is based in Santiago, and is controlled by the Matte family. Bernardo Matte is the president. The CEO is Alberto Schilling Redlich.

In 2013, Banco BICE received a US$75 million loan from the International Finance Corporation (IFC) to fund long-term renewable energy projects.
