= Kodama case =

2011 Chilean payment controversy

The Kodama case is a payment controversy that involved the Ministry of Housing and Urban Development of Chile, led by Magdalena Matte, in 2011. The ministry had entered into a judicial agreement that authorized a significant payment of 17 billion Chilean pesos (equivalent to approximately 24,000,000 euros in 2011) to the construction contractor "Consorcio de Construcciones Kodama Ltda." for construction works. However, these works were originally assessed to have a maximum value of 3 billion pesos by the Institute of Experimental and Materials Research (IDIEM) at the University of Chile. Just as the payment transaction, which would have facilitated the construction of 15,000 Chilean social housing units, was about to take place, it was abruptly halted.

== Background ==
The controversy had its roots in the construction works for Transantiago, a major public transport project in Santiago. Under the administration of Michelle Bachelet, the Ministry of Housing and Urban Development ordered the construction of a bus lane on "Avenida Pedro Aguirre Cerda" in November 2006. The project was initially budgeted at 25.5 billion pesos and was scheduled for completion in 2007. However, due to changes in the project, it was not finished until May 2010, 899 days later than planned.

As a result of these changes, the construction contractor, Kodama Ltda., demanded 7 billion pesos from the ministry in 2009. However, the ministry valued the additional costs at only 950 million pesos, as stated in Resolution 134 on February 16, 2010, and communicated this to the General Comptroller's Office. Eight months later, under the administration of Sebastián Piñera, the Comptroller's Office rejected the payment transaction and authorized the payment of a significantly reduced amount, only 95 million pesos, on October 6, 2010.

== Legal proceedings and settlement ==
On December 15, 2010, Kodama Ltda. filed a lawsuit against the Chilean state, claiming 41 billion pesos in compensation at the 10th Civil Court of Santiago. This amount was significantly higher, 493% more, than the initially demanded 7 billion.

For reasons that remain unclear, on January 25, 2011, the Ministry of Housing and Urban Development, through Decree 8, authorized the payment of 17 billion pesos to the contractor Kodama Ltda. The contractor accepted this offer, and the agreement was signed in the 10th Civil Court of Santiago.

== Kodama Ltda. ==
Consorcio de Construcciones Kodama Ltda., owned by Japanese businessman Kenji Kodama, had been involved in government construction projects for 18 years. The company placed the blame for the project delays and the 130 changes made to the original plan on the inefficiency of the ministry. In support of their payment request, the contractor referenced an investigation conducted by Engineering DICTUC, a subsidiary company of the Catholic University of Chile.

== Consequences ==
The payment controversy sparked an investigation led by prosecutor José Morales. In the aftermath of the controversy, Minister Magdalena Matte resigned on April 19, 2011. Additionally, on April 25, the director of Serviu (Housing and Urban Development Service), Antonio Llompart, the deputy director of legal affairs of the Ministry, Rafael Marambio (who admitted accepting an airline ticket to Buenos Aires from Kodama), and the deputy director of Pavement and Road Works, Franz Greve, also resigned. Álvaro Baeza, an advisor to Minister Matte, also tendered his resignation.
