= Magdalena Matte =

Chilean businesswoman and politician

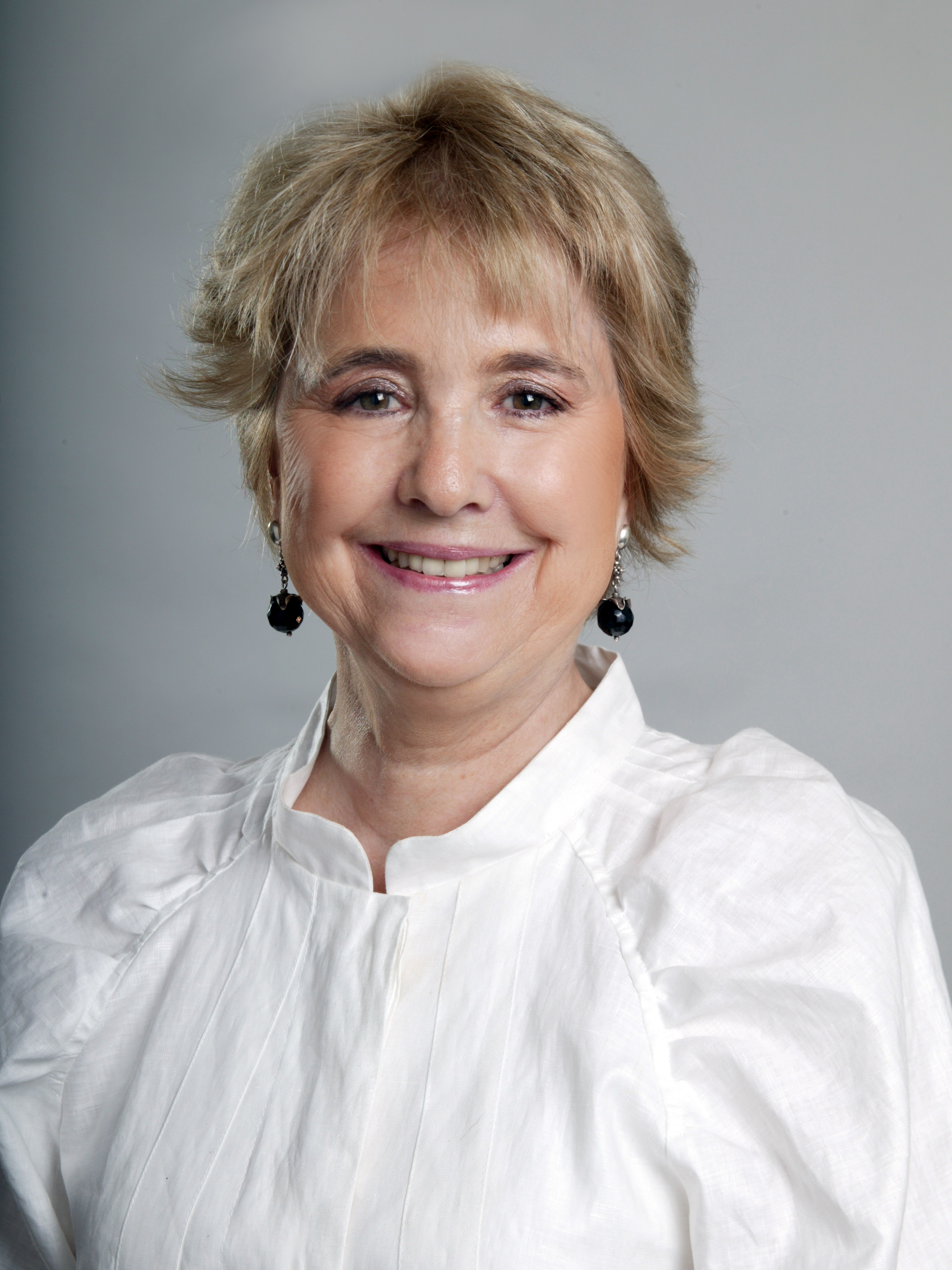

Minister of Housing and Urbanism
- In office 11 March 2010 – 19 April 2011
- President: Sebastián Pinera
- Preceded by: Patricia Poblete Bennett
- Succeeded by: Rodrigo Pérez Mackenna

Personal details
- Born: August 13, 1950 (age 76) Santiago, Chile
- Party: Independent Democrat Union (UDI)
- Spouse: Hernán Larraín Fernández
- Children: 6 (inc. Pablo Larraín)
- Relatives: Matte family
- Education: Pontifical Catholic University of Chile
- Occupation: Civil Engineer, Businesswoman, Politician
- Website: Pinera2010.cl

Magdalena Matte Lecaros (born August 13, 1950) is a Chilean businesswoman and politician. She is member of the Independent Democratic Union (UDI) and was part of Chile's Ministry of Housing and Urban Development under Chile's former President Sebastián Piñera for the term of 2010–2014. She is a member of the Matte family.

== Biography ==
Matte was born in Santiago. Her paternal grandmother, Rosa Ester Alessandri Rodríguez, was the daughter of Arturo Alessandri, Chile's president during 1920–1925 and 1932–1938. Rosa was also the sister of Jorge Alessandri, President of Chile between 1958 and 1964. Her paternal grandfather, Arturo Matte Larraín, was a lawyer and congressman, Minister of the State, presidential candidate (1952), and a founder of forestal and paper company CMPC.

Matte lost her father, Arturo Matte Alessandri, in 1965 when she was 14 years of age. She completed her schooling in Santiago's Colegio Santa Úrsula. She completed her university studies in the Pontifical Catholic University of Chile majoring in civil engineering. In 1974, she married Hernán Larraín Fernández, who is a Chilean Senator and former President of the Senate between 2004 and 2005, with whom she has six children.

== Career ==
She has worked in the private sector, mainly in the company Papeleria Dimar, of which she has been both executive and investor. In 2002, she worked with Fondo Confianza though the foundation La Vaca, wherein she aided in funding entrepreneurial women of low-economic resources. She created 230 work and education centers which cater to 3,000 women in the area of El Maule Sur.

== Politics ==
On February 9, 2010, Chile's then-President-elect Sebastián Piñera nominated Magdalena Matte as his Minister of Housing and Urban Development. On April 19, 2011, Magdalena stepped down as minister due to the suspect millionaire compensation payment to the construction company Kodama.

== See also ==
- Kodama case
