= Homeless (disambiguation) =

Homelessness is the condition of people without a regular dwelling.

Homeless may also refer to:

- Homeless (film), a 2019 adult animated comedy film.
- "Homeless" (Darin song), 2006, covered by Leona Lewis in 2007
- "Homeless" (Marina Kaye song), 2014
- "Homeless" (Paul Simon and Ladysmith Black Mambazo song), 1986
- "Homeless", a 1998 song by Love Inc.
- The Homeless, a 1974 Japanese film directed by Kōichi Saitō
- "Homeless" (Drifters), a 2016 television episode
- Homeless Heidi, a character played by actress Greta Lee in the television series High Maintenance
