= Rebeca Matte Bello =

Chilean sculptor (1875–1929)

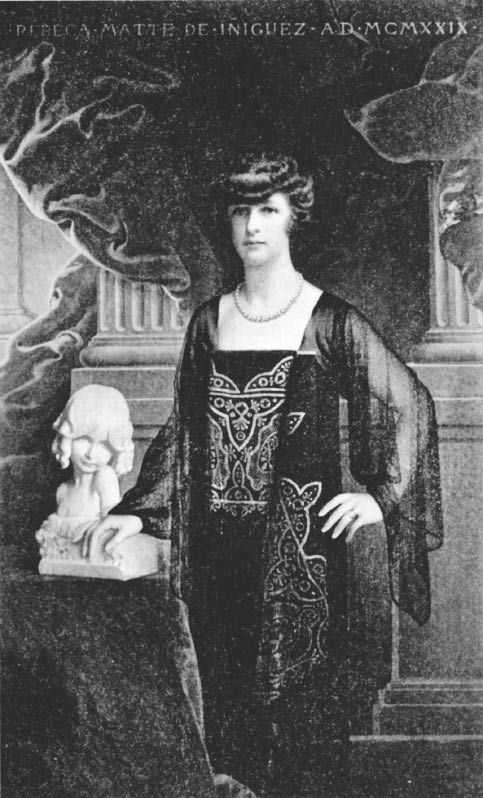
- Oil on canvas by Vittorio Matteo Corcos
- Born: October 29, 1875; Santiago, Chile
- Died: May 15, 1929 (aged 53); Paris, France
- Known for: Sculpture

Rebeca Matte Bello (Spanish pronunciation: [reˈβeka ˈmate]; October 29, 1875 – May 15, 1929) was a Chilean sculptor. Her sculptures are in the collection of the Chilean National Museum of Fine Arts, including her sculpture Icarus and Daedalus, which resides outside the museum.

== Early life and education ==
Rebeca Matte, born October 29, 1875, in Santiago, Chile, was the only daughter of Rebecca Reyes and Augusto Matte, an ambassador for Chile. While living in Santiago, she was educated by her grandmother. Matte was exposed to many intellectuals of Chile at the time, including José Victorino Lastarria, Gabriel Jordan Amunátegui, and Alberto Blest Gana. Her father would move to Paris, and Matte would be educated in Europe.

In Europe, she first studied in Rome, under Giulio Monteverde. In Paris, she studied at the Académie Julian under Paul Dubois and Denys Puech. As a young artist, she found influence in the work of Auguste Rodin. She would marry diplomat Pedro Felipe Larrain Iñíguez, and she would give birth to their daughter, Lily Iñíguez Matte. Lily would die in 1926, this grief causing Matte not to sculpt anymore.

== Career ==
In 1899, she displayed a statue entitled "Horace" at the Salon in Paris, a work showing the physical and psychological rigidity associated with an epileptic seizure. In 1908, the Chilean government commissioned her to design a sculpture for the International Court of Justice at The Hague. Bello displayed two works at the 1913 Salon d'Automne. The first, "full of allure and vigor", is a bust of an older wrestler shown "defying the harshness of life". The second work, which was said to be one of the nicer works in the Salon, was called "A Life"; it was a representation of a beautiful, mature woman sitting on a stone sphinx, looking backwards. Le Figaro describes the artist as a fine talent from the young Latin American school of art and noted her ease and control over the execution of these works. It notes that she studied under Denys Puech and a Monsieur Dubois.

The piece commissioned for the International Court of Justice was installed in 1914; it was called The War.

The Chilean government continued to commission works from Matte, and in 1914, she created Heroes de la Concepción, located in Santiago. Matte became a teacher at the Accademia di Belle Arti Firenze in 1918.

== Later life and death ==
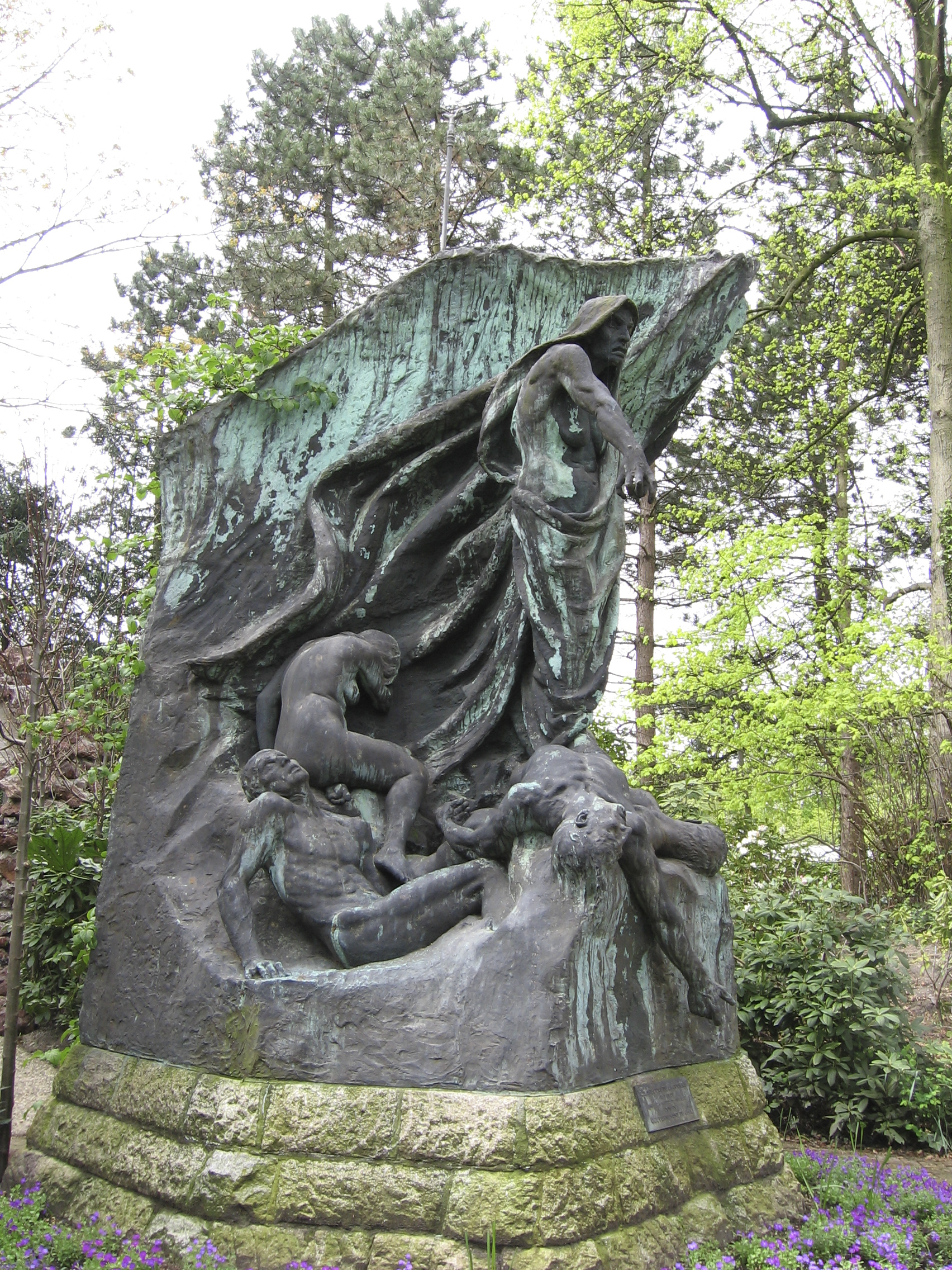
Spectre de la Guerre, 1908–1914, Peace Palace garden, The Hague.

Matte's daughter, Lily, would be diagnosed with tuberculosis and would die in a sanatorium in the Swiss Alps in 1926. Matte would become depressed over Lily's death and would cease creating art, focusing on charity work on behalf of her daughter. Matte died in Paris on May 14, 1929.

In 1929, after her death, her husband donated Icarus and Daedalus to the Chilean National Museum of Fine Arts. The piece, a copy of the original, which was commissioned by the government of Chile as a gift to the country of Brazil and is on public display in Rio de Janeiro, was placed outside the museum in 1930. An award, named after Matte, was created in 1922 by the Chilean Ministry of Education for notable Chilean sculptors.

== Notable works ==
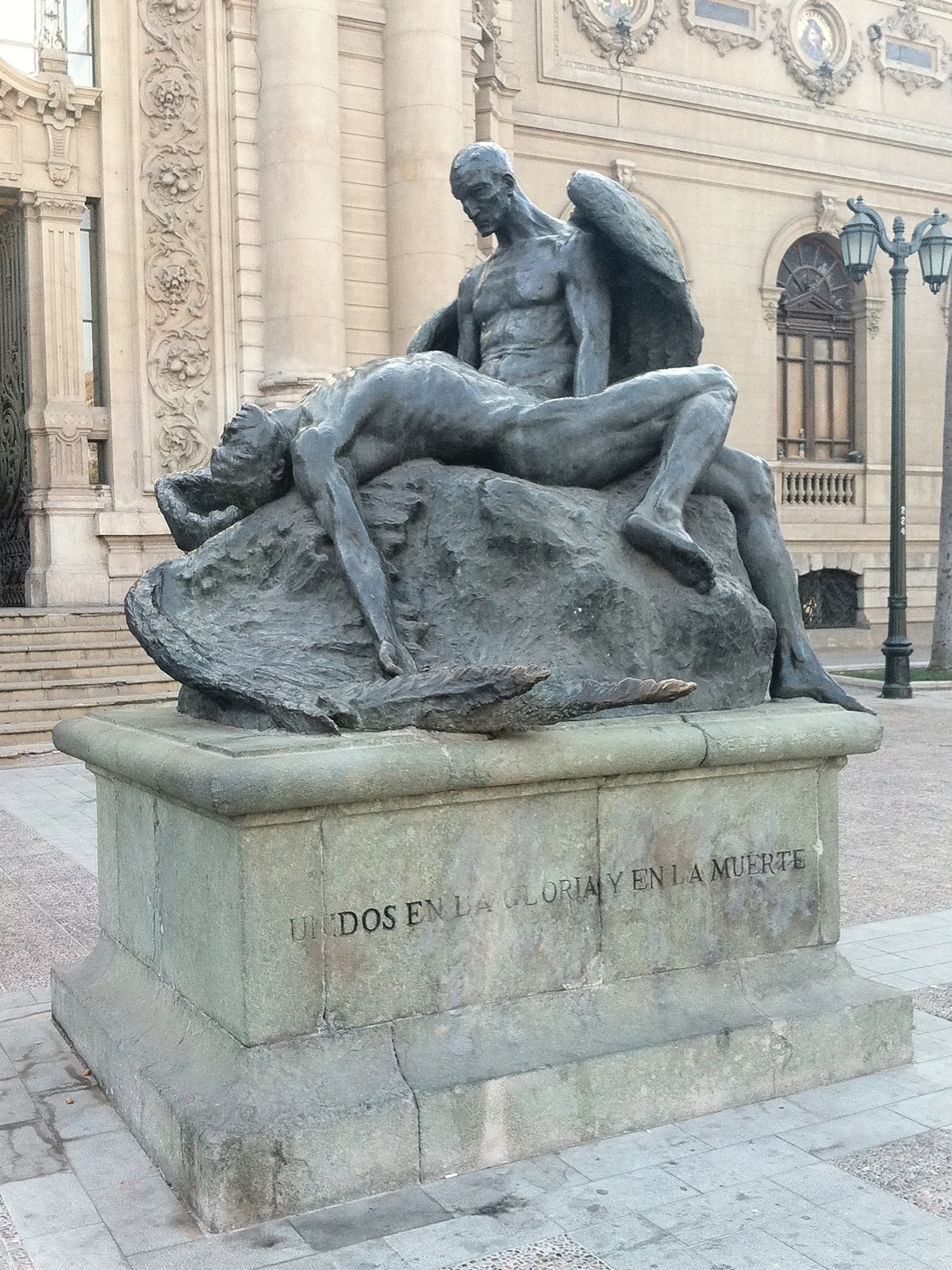
Icarus and Daedalus (1922)

- Santa Teresa, Paris, 1907 sculpture.
- Unidos en la gloria y en la muerte (Ícaro y Dédalo), 1922, Bronze, 200 cm de alto, Museo Nacional de Bellas Artes, Chile.
- Horacio, marble, 200 cm de alto, Chilean National Museum of Fine Arts.
- El eco, marble, 142 cm de alto, Chilean National Museum of Fine Arts
- Crudo invierno, 1912, bronze, 60 cm de alto, Museo Nacional de Bellas Artes, Chile.
- Militza, marble, 155 cm de alto, Museo de Arte y Artesanía de Linares, Chile.
- La guerra, commissioned 1908, installed 1914, Peace Palace garden, The Hague, The Netherlands (a gift from the Chilean government to the Peace Palace)
- Tristeza, marble, Galería Pitti, Florence, Italie.
- Homenaje a los héroes de la Concepción, 1920, bronze, Avda. Libertador Bernardo O'Higgins, Santiago, Chile.
- Los aviadores, 1923, bronze, Plaza Mauá, Río de Janeiro, Brasil.
- Icarus and Daedalus, 1922, Chilean National Museum of Fine Arts.
- Ulises y Calipso, 1925, marble, Hall del Club de La Unión, Santiago, Chile.
- Mi hija, marble, Cemetery Général, Santiago, Chile.
- Dolor, marbre, Cemetery Général, Santiago, Chile.
- Militza, on loan to Musée des Arts et Métiers de Linares, Chile.

== Bibliography ==
- (es) Isabel Cruz de Amenabar, Rebeca Matte Bello : 1875–1929, Origo, 2008.
- (es) Isabel Cruz de Amenabar, Manos de mujer : Rebeca Matte Bello y su época, 1875–1929, Origo, 2008.
- (es) Ana María Larraín, Rebecca Matte, escultora del dolor, Zig-Zag, 1994.
