= Sonia Tschorne =

Chilean architect and politician

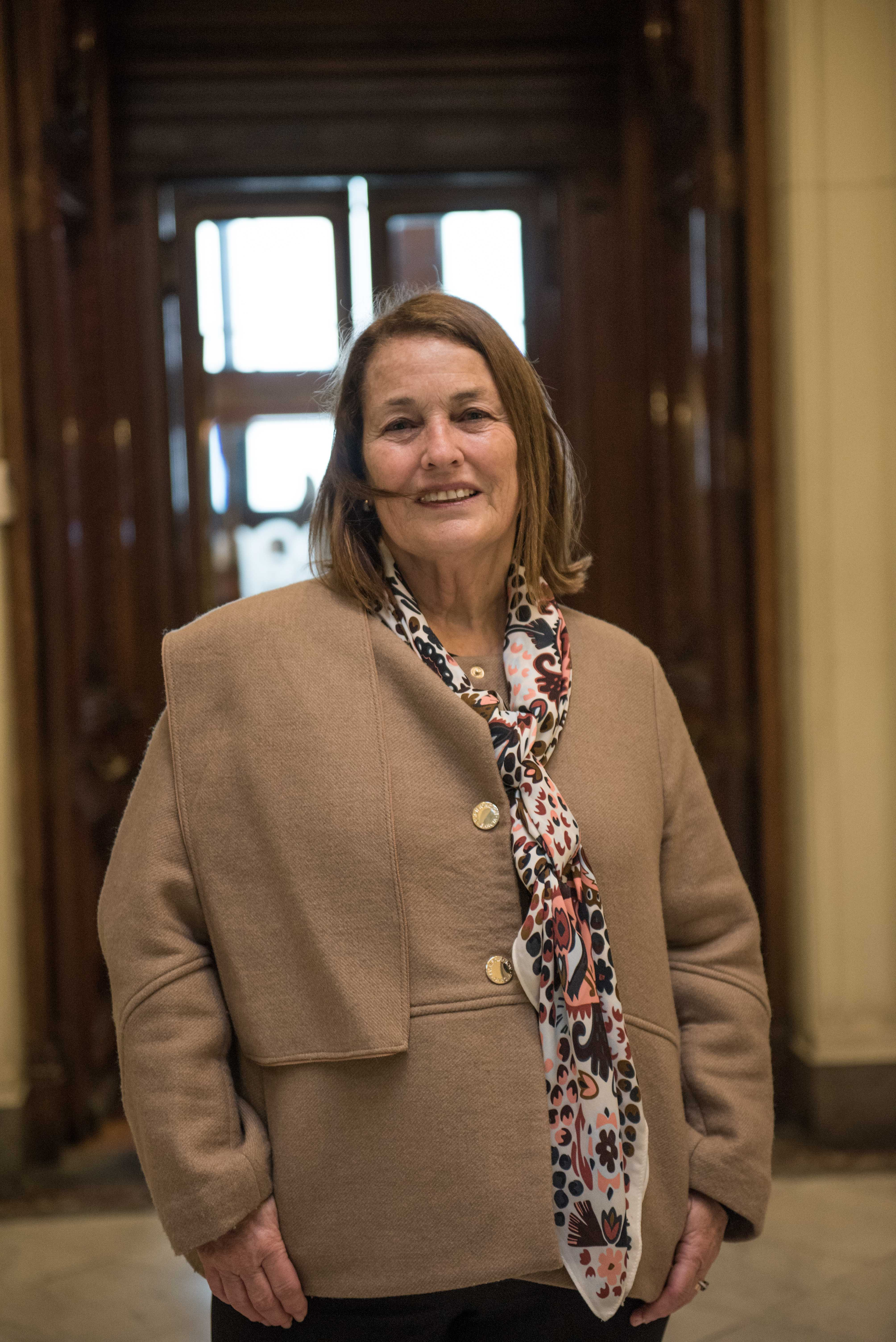

Minister of Housing & Urbanism
- In office 29 September 2004 – 11 March 2006
- President: Ricardo Lagos
- Preceded by: Jaime Ravinet
- Succeeded by: Patricia Poblete

Minister of National Assets
- In office 29 December 2004 – 11 March 2006
- President: Ricardo Lagos
- Preceded by: Jaime Ravinet
- Succeeded by: Romy Schmidt

Personal details
- Born: 26 April 1954 (age 72) Santiago, Chile
- Education: University of Chile (B.Sc); Pontifical Catholic University of Chile (M.Sc)
- Profession: Architect

Sonia Tschorne Berestesky (born 26 April 1954) is an architect and Chilean politician.

She has been a militant for the Socialist Party for the last 16 years, working with the governments of the Concertación de partidos por la democracia (Pact of parties for democracy ) since 1990. She became the Ministry of Public Works' National Director of Architecture and Deputy Secretary of Urban Development during the governments of Eduardo Frei Ruiz-Tagle and Ricardo Lagos.

As an architect, one of her last and most important works was the Master Building Plan of Central Santiago.

== Biography ==
She studied architecture at the University of Chile, graduating in 1982. Later, she received a master's degree at the Catholic University of Chile in urban planning.

Between 2004 and 2006, she was appointed Ministry of National Assets, succeeding Jaime Ravinet. In 2008, she was serving as Chile's Undersecretary of Public Works.

In 2024, she was appointed Counselor and President of the Concessions Council of the Ministry of Public Works.

== Public career ==
As an architect, one of her last and most significant professional projects was the Master Plan for the Development of Downtown Santiago.

In politics, she joined the Socialist Party of Chile (PS) in 1980 at the age of sixteen. She subsequently served in the governments of the centre-left Concertación coalition, which governed Chile from 1990 to 2010.

During the administration of President Eduardo Frei Ruiz-Tagle, from 1994 to 2000, she served as National Director of the Architecture Division of the Ministry of Public Works (MOP). In that role, she also chaired the Nemesio Antúnez Commission, which was responsible for incorporating public artworks into buildings, public spaces, and major public infrastructure projects throughout the country.

On 11 March 2000, President Ricardo Lagos appointed her Undersecretary of Housing and Urbanism, a position she held until 29 September 2004, when she was simultaneously appointed Minister of Housing and Urbanism and Minister of National Assets, succeeding Jaime Ravinet, who had been appointed Minister of National Defense. Her appointment also ended the long-standing control of the Christian Democratic Party (PDC) over the Housing Ministry.

She served as a dual cabinet minister until the end of the Lagos administration on 11 March 2006, when fellow Socialist Michelle Bachelet assumed the presidency. She then returned to the Ministry of Public Works, first working in the newly created Directorate for the Oversight and Supervision of Concessioned Public Works at the request of Minister Eduardo Bitran, and later becoming Director General of Public Works at the request of Bitran's successor, Sergio Bitar. In this capacity, she participated in efforts to reactivate the public concessions programme, as well as other infrastructure projects that had stalled during the early years of the Michelle Bachelet administration.

After leaving government in 2010, she joined the boards of several public enterprises, including EMOS, Metro S.A. and the Empresa Portuaria Valparaíso, as well as private companies including Aguas Cordillera and Aguas Andinas. She also served on the Concessions Council of the Ministry of Public Works and became a member of the Infrastructure Policy Council (CPI). Since November 2018, she has served on the board of the National Council for Urban Development (CNDU).
