= Rodrigo Pérez Mackenna =

Chilean minister

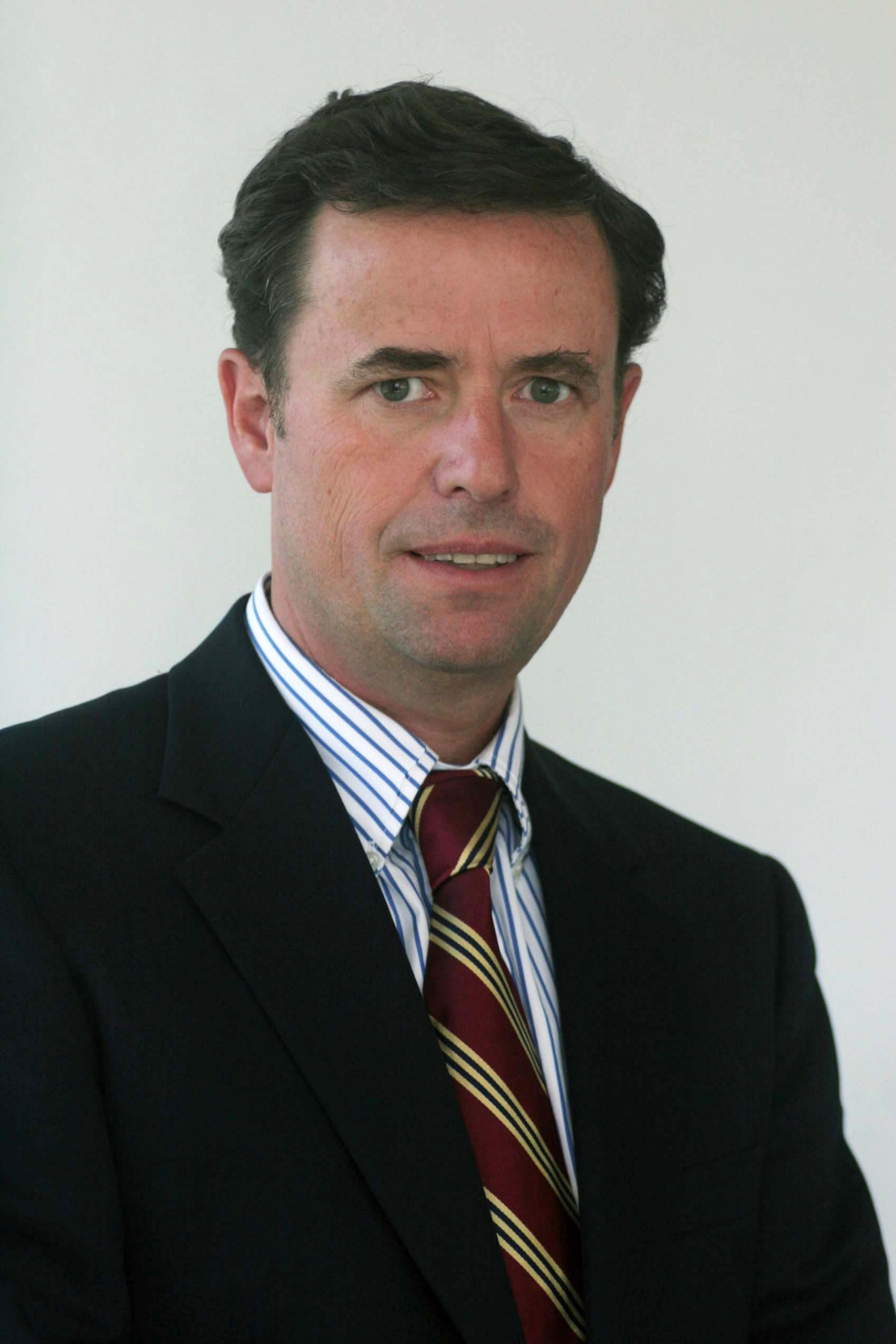

Minister of National Assets
- In office 5 November 2012 – 11 March 2014
- President: Sebastián Pinera
- Preceded by: Catalina Parot
- Succeeded by: Víctor Osorio Reyes

Minister of Housing and Urbanism
- In office 19 April 2011 – 11 March 2014
- President: Sebastián Pinera
- Preceded by: Magdalena Matte
- Succeeded by: Paulina Saball

Intendant of O'Higgins Region
- In office 11 March 2010 – 19 April 2011
- President: Sebastián Pinera
- Preceded by: Juan Núñez
- Succeeded by: Patricio Rey

Personal details
- Born: 21 December 1960 (age 65) Santiago, Chile
- Party: Independent Democratic Union (UDI)
- Spouse: Paula Aspillaga
- Children: Six
- Parent(s): Francisco Pérez Concha; María de la Luz Mackenna
- Relatives: Francisco Pérez Mackenna (brother)
- Education: Pontifical Catholic University of Chile
- Occupation: Politician
- Profession: Civil Engineer

Rodrigo Pérez Mackenna (born 21 December 1960) is a Chilean scholar, consultant and entrepreneur. He was bi-minister during president Sebastián Piñera's first government: he served as Housing & Urbanism Minister (2011–2014) and National Assets Minister (2012–2014).

He studied at Pontifical Catholic University of Chile.

After an extensive career in the private sector, he joined the State of Chile in March 2010, being appointment as Libertador General Bernardo O'Higgins Region Intendant. He remained as Intendant until mid-April 2011 when Piñera decided to send him to Housing Minister in replace of Magdalena Matte.

In 2014 was elected Chile's AFP Union Association president.

== Biography ==
Born to Francisco Pérez Concha, a commercial engineer, and María de la Luz Mackenna Dávila, a secretary at Codelco during the Anaconda period, he was educated at Saint George's College and Tabancura School in Santiago. Among his siblings is Francisco, who has had an extensive career in companies linked to the Luksic family.

He later entered the Pontifical Catholic University of Chile to study industrial civil engineering, where his classmates included Laurence Golborne, Pedro Pablo Errázuriz, and Pablo Simonetti.

While working, he later traveled to Barcelona, Spain, to pursue a Master of Business Administration (MBA) at the IESE Business School of the University of Navarra, where he established professional ties with future businessmen such as Patricio Jottar, Heriberto Urzúa, and Francisco Gutiérrez.

Married to Paula Aspillaga, he is the father of six children.

== Professional career ==
He began his professional career at Copec, under the leadership of Felipe Lamarca and Baltazar Sánchez.

After completing his postgraduate studies, in 1988 he joined Citicorp, where he served as general manager of its stockbroker subsidiary, while developing a close professional relationship with Patricio Parodi and Juan Bilbao.

He later moved to Bankers Trust at the suggestion of Parodi, becoming investment manager of AFP Provida, a subsidiary of the firm. In that role, he managed portfolios totaling approximately US$2.5 billion.

In 1993, he was appointed general manager of Bankers Trust’s life insurance company. He subsequently took over as head of investments for Bankers Trust.

In 1999, following the global acquisition of Bankers Trust by Deutsche Bank, and after the departure of Parodi and Bilbao from the partnership, Pérez Mackenna became country head of the German bank’s Chilean subsidiary.

In 2004, he temporarily assumed leadership of Deutsche Bank’s Mexican subsidiary. He concluded his executive career within the group in March 2006.

Thereafter—and following a sabbatical year in Australia with his family—he combined advisory work for businessman Eduardo Fernández León with his own ventures in the aquaculture, agricultural, and industrial sectors, among others.
