= Paulina Saball =

Chilean politician (born 1952)

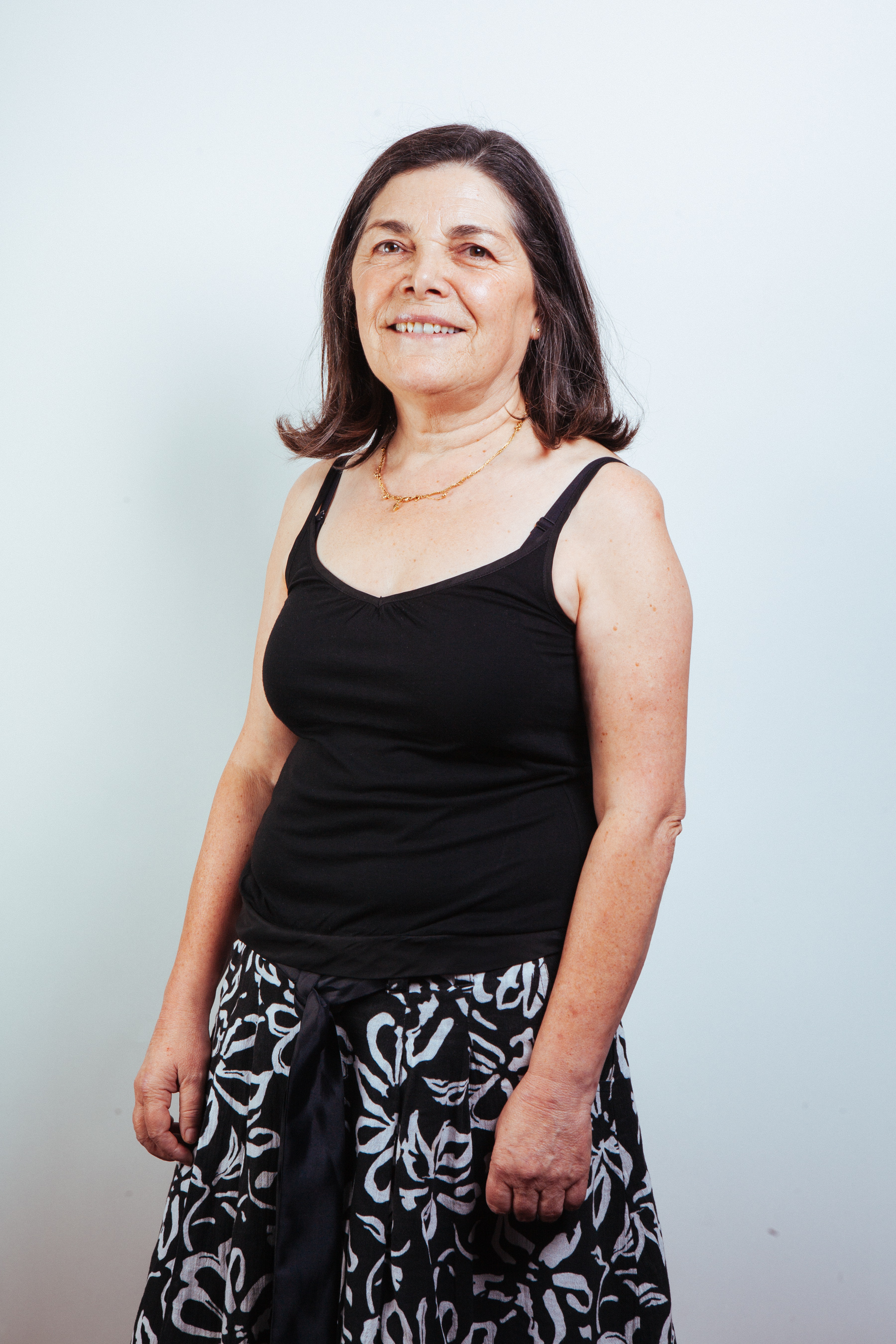
- Saball in 2014

Minister of Housing and Urbanism
- In office 11 March 2014 – 11 March 2018
- President: Michelle Bachelet
- Preceded by: Rodrigo Pérez Mackenna
- Succeeded by: Cristián Monckeberg

Personal details
- Born: María Paulina Saball Astaburuaga; 26 October 1952 (age 73) Santiago, Chile
- Party: Party for Democracy
- Other political affiliations: Popular Unitary Action Movement
- Education: Pontifical Catholic University of Chile
- Occupation: Politician
- Profession: Social worker

María Paulina Saball Astaburuaga (born 26 October 1952) is a Chilean politician and social worker. She was a minister during the second government of Michelle Bachelet.

Saball studied at the Pontifical Catholic University of Chile, where she was a member of the leftist movement Popular Unitary Action Movement (MAPU).

Saball was an opponent to the Pinochet dictatorship and was linked to human rights defense groups through various entities, such as the Committee of Cooperation for Peace in Chile and the Vicariate of Solidarity. Similarly, once returned the democracy she was part of the National Commission for Truth and Reconciliation (Rettig Report) during the christian-democratic government of Patricio Aylwin.

== Early life and education ==
Saball is the daughter of Gustavo Saball Meneses and Carmen Astaburuaga Silva. She was married to sociologist Fernando José Ossandón Correa, with whom she had two children, Felipe and Macarena. She later married Socialist lawyer Ernesto Alejandro Galaz Cañas.

She studied at the Pontifical Catholic University of Chile, where she became involved with the left-wing Popular Unitary Action Movement (MAPU).

Following the 1973 Chilean coup d'état, Saball became involved in human rights advocacy through organizations including the Committee for Peace in Chile, the Vicariate of Solidarity, and later the National Commission for Truth and Reconciliation in 1990.

== Political career ==
During the administration of President Patricio Aylwin, Saball worked as head of the Outreach and Promotion Unit at the Ministry of Housing and Urbanism, then headed by engineer Alberto Etchegaray Aubry.

Between 1994 and 1997, she served as chief of staff to Minister of National Assets Adriana Delpiano, and subsequently remained with the ministry as an adviser following Delpiano's departure.

In 1999, President Eduardo Frei Ruiz-Tagle appointed her Undersecretary of National Assets, serving alongside Minister Sergio Galilea. She was confirmed in the position by President Ricardo Lagos in 2000.

In February 2004, Lagos appointed her executive director of the National Environment Commission (CONAMA).

At the beginning of the first Bachelet administration in March 2006, Saball was appointed Undersecretary of Housing and Urbanism, serving until 2010. In 2014, Bachelet selected her to serve as Minister of Housing and Urbanism.

In August 2020, she became regional coordinator for Magallanes and Chilean Antarctica of the Horizonte Ciudadano Foundation, established by Bachelet in 2018.

In February 2023, President Gabriel Boric appointed Saball to oversee the housing reconstruction plan in areas affected by the wildfires in south-central Chile, including the regions of Ñuble, Biobío, and La Araucanía.
