= Martina Barros Borgoño =

Chilean writer

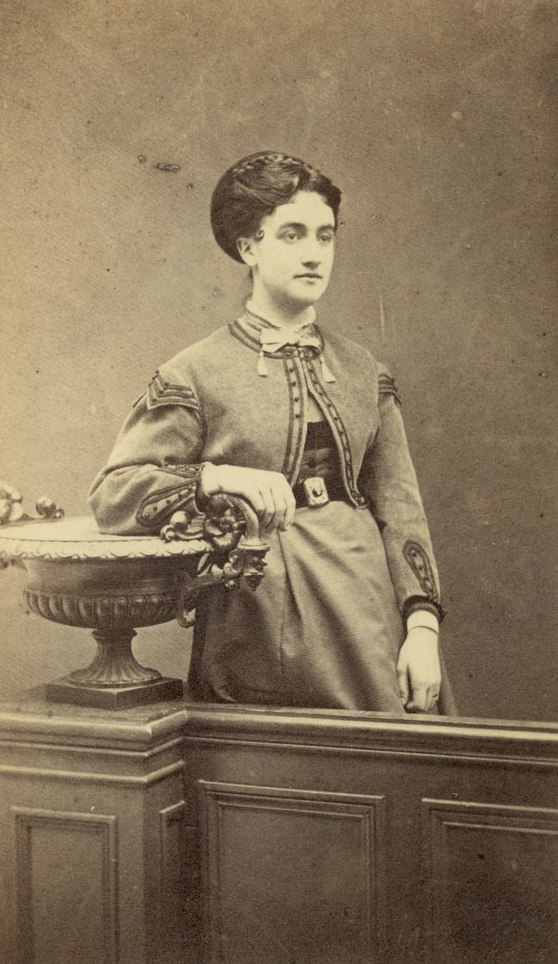
- Born: 6 July 1850; Santiago, Chile
- Died: 1944 (aged 93–94); Santiago, Chile
- Occupation: Writer

Martina Mercedes Eugenia Barros Borgoño Lucia (6 July 1850 – 1944) was a Chilean writer and a forerunner of feminism in Chile who advocated for women's suffrage.

== Early years ==
Martina Barros Borgoño was born in Santiago on 6 July 1850. She was the eldest daughter of Manuel Barros Arana, brother of the historian Diego Barros Arana, and Eugenia Borgoño Vergara, daughter of Gen. José Manuel Borgoño Núñez, winner of the loyalist resistance in Chiloé. Along with her brothers Manuel (1852–1903), Louis (1858–1943) and Victor grew up in the house of her paternal grandfather, Diego Antonio Barros Fernández de Leiva (1789–1853), until the death of her father. Then, she moved to her historian uncle's house, located in the old street of the Capuchins (now Rosas), where she acquired an education in keeping with the intellectual and refined environment of her tutor.

== Education ==
Martina studied at different private schools in Santiago. In 1853 she joined the Rafaela Fernández's school and later the Miss Whitelock's school. Years later she admitted not having learned much in those schools, which she left at 11 years of age. Her greatest source of education was her uncle Diego, as she herself would say in her memoirs, entitled Memories of My Life:

in my case, I owe my work to my uncle Diego that took care of me while I was single, I think it would not have been possible to find a better teacher ... [my education] I also owe to my own initiative, my thirst for knowledge, my admiration for superior talent, which has been one of the characteristics of my life.

== Publishing controversy ==
Martina became known in 1872, at age 22 when she published a translation of the book The Subjection of Women (1869), by the English philosopher and political economist John Stuart Mill (1806-1873), with the title The Bondage of Women. Her translation was in the Santiago Journal, founded by Fanor Velasco and Augusto Orrego Luco (1849-1933), whom she married in 1874. This publication, a pioneer in its day, included a very controversial prologue, by the same Orrego Luco, her then-boyfriend, who produced, paradoxically, a pleasant reaction in the liberal male circles of his time. Her translation, however, received an overwhelming rejection by women who saw her as a "dangerous girl,' as she writes in her memoir, deciding not to publish it. Despite this, and since then, the equality of women became Martina's main objective.

== Social connections ==
Martina was able to meet many influential people of the time since, as a result of her relatives who held prominence in public life - her husband, her brother Luis, Alessandri Palma contender in the 1920 elections, and her aunt Julia Borgoño Vergara, married to Admiral Patricio Lynch. These added a long list of social relations that she and her family carefully tended. Thus, in her long life, in addition to having two camps in her home - a political one, through her husband, and a literary one, on her part, she cultivated the friendship of the Amunátegui Aldunate, Ramón Barros Luco, Manuel Blanco Encalada brothers, the Blest Gana, José Victorino Lastarria and Santander, Pedro Lira Rencoret, Enrique Mac Iver Rodríguez brothers, the Matta Goyenechea, Ramón Sotomayor Valdés, José Tomás Urmeneta and García-Abello brothers, and the Benjamín Vicuña Mackenna and Joaquín Walker Martínez brothers.

She also had the opportunity to socialize with the Chilean presidents from Manuel Montt Torres to Arturo Alessandri Palma. She interracted with the foreigners Jean Gustave Courcelle-Seneuil, Ignacio Domeyko, Claude Gay and Rudolf Philippi. She also enjoyed the personal friendship of the then exiled Argentines and later presidents, Bartolomé Mitre and Domingo Faustino Sarmiento as well as the former Peruvian president Manuel Pardo.

== Her work ==
Also, her active social and intellectual life put her in touch with other women with similar concerns. In 1917, she was invited to the Club of Ladies by Delia Matte Pérez, president of the association, where, in the first meeting, she gave a lecture on women's suffrage, an issue almost unprecedented for those times. There, Martina said "we have said, and repeated a lot, that we are not prepared for this ... Without any preparation we give ourselves into marriage, to be mothers, which is the largest of our duties, and for that neither the church nor the law, neither parents nor her husband require from us anything but the will to accept it."

While her work is not extensive, the life told in her memoirs makes allusions to the need for women's liberation, not with a separatist or egalitarian spirit, but rather to contribute to the progress of Chile.

Martina Mercedes Eugenia Barros Lucia Borgoño finished writing her memoirs in 1939, published in 1942, and died in 1944.

== Publications ==
- The Slavery of Women in The Santiago Journal, 1872.
- Memories of my life. Santiago: Orbe, 1942.
