= Eliodoro Matte Ossa =

Chilean businessperson (1905–2000)

- Born: 11 April 1905; Santiago, Chile
- Died: 22 July 2000 (aged 95); Santiago, Chile
- Spouse: married
- Children: Eliodoro Matte; Bernardo Matte; Patricia Matte
- Parent(s): Eliodoro Matte Gormaz and Rosario Ossa Lynch

Eliodoro Matte Ossa (11 April 1905 – 22 July 2000) was a Chilean businessman, founder of the Chilean forestry and paper company CMPC.

He is the son of Eliodoro Matte Gormaz and Rosario Ossa Lynch.

In 1942, he married María Larraín Vial, and they had three children, Eliodoro Matte, Bernardo Matte, and Patricia Matte

As of October 2015, Forbes stated that all his three children were billionaires.
