= Pablo Larraín =

Chilean filmmaker (born 1976)

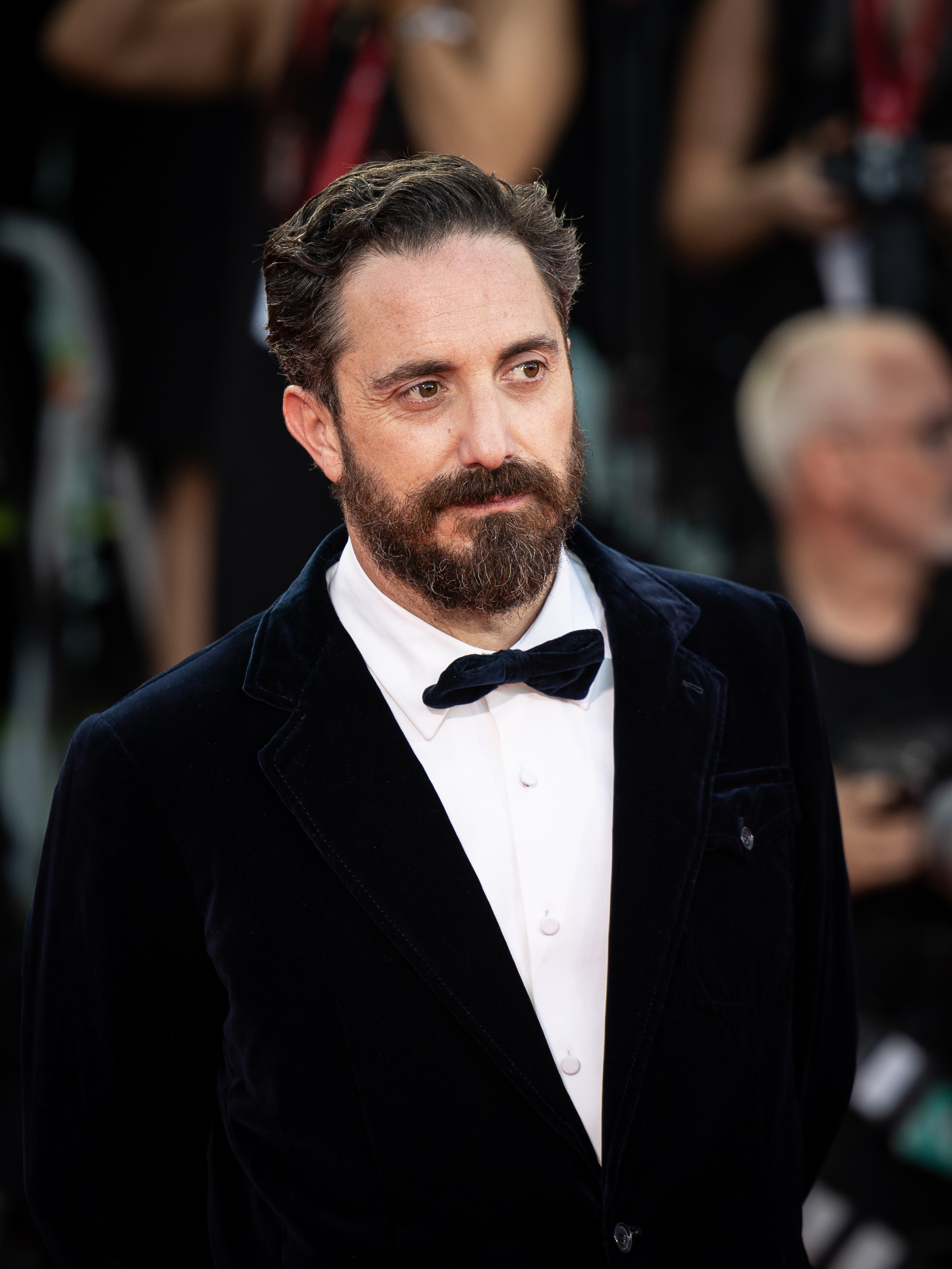
- Larraín at the 2024 Venice Film Festival
- Born: Pablo Larraín Matte; 19 August 1976 (age 50); Santiago, Chile
- Education: Instituto Profesional IACC
- Occupation: Filmmaker
- Years active: 2003–present
- Style: Drama, crime, historical drama, biographical film
- Spouse: Antonia Zegers (m. 2008; div. 2014)
- Children: 2
- Parents: Hernán Larraín (father); Magdalena Matte (mother)
- Relatives: Hernán Larraín Matte (brother); Juana Lecaros (great-aunt); Arturo Matte (grandfather); Arturo Alessandri (great-great-grandfather)

Pablo Larraín Matte (Spanish pronunciation: [laraˈin]; born 19 August 1976) is a Chilean filmmaker. He first gained international recognition for films examining Chilean history and the legacy of the dictatorship of Augusto Pinochet, including Tony Manero (2008), Post Mortem (2010), No (2012), and El Conde (2023). He also directed Jackie (2016), Spencer (2021), and Maria (2024), a trilogy centered on prominent women of the twentieth century. No was the first Chilean film nominated for Best Foreign Language Film at the Academy Awards, while Larraín and his brother Juan de Dios co-produced Sebastián Lelio's A Fantastic Woman (2017), which became the first film from Chile to win the Oscar in that category. In 2021, Larraín directed the Apple TV+ psychological romance horror miniseries Lisey's Story.

Larraín won the Silver Bear Grand Jury Prize for The Club at the 65th Berlin International Film Festival, and he and Guillermo Calderón won the Best Screenplay award at the 80th Venice International Film Festival for El Conde.

== Early life and education ==
Pablo Larraín Matte was born in Santiago, Chile, the son of law professor (and later Independent Democratic Union senator) Hernán Larraín, and Magdalena Matte, Sebastián Piñera's former minister of Housing and Urbanism.

His great-grandfather was Arturo Matte, co-founder of the pulp and paper company CMPC. His great-great-grandfather was the 18th and 22nd President of Chile Arturo Alessandri. His maternal grandmother was sister of painter Juana Lecaros, and partner of Víctor Pey who was portrayed, with Alessandri, in his film Neruda.

He graduated with a degree in audiovisual communication from the Instituto Profesional IACC in Santiago.

== Career ==
=== Early career ===
In 2003, with his brother, Juan de Dios, Larraín co-founded the production company Fábula, through which he develops his cinematic and advertising projects and supports the work of emerging international directors.

Larraín directed his first feature film, Fuga, in 2005. It was released in March 2006 and achieved international acclaim with several prizes at international film festivals, including the Cartagena Film Festival and the Málaga Film Festival. In 2008, he released his second feature-length film, Tony Manero, about a serial killer with an obsession for John Travolta's character in Saturday Night Fever, the film premiered at the 2008 Cannes Film Festival, where it was part of the Directors' Fortnight section. His next film, Post Mortem, was released in 2010 and centers on a coroner's assistant during the days of 1973 coup that brought Pinochet to power. The movie premiered at the 67th Venice International Film Festival, where it competed for the Golden Lion in the official competition section.

=== 2010s ===
In 2011, Larraín directed the television series Prófugos, which was the first series produced in Chile by HBO Latin America. The series was nominated for Best Drama Series at the 42nd International Emmy Awards.

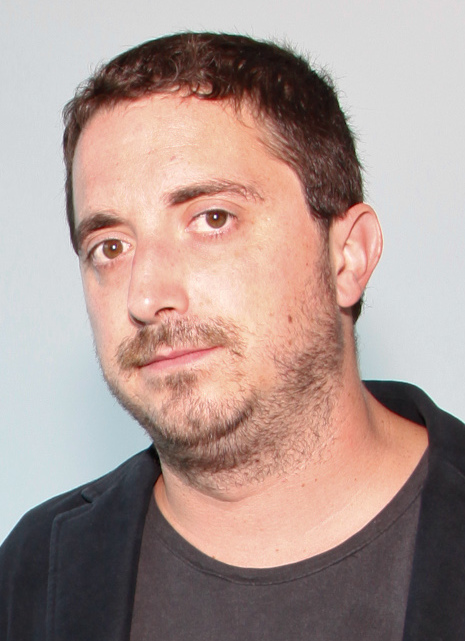
Larraín in 2012

In 2012, he released No, in which Gael García Bernal plays an advertising company executive who runs the "No" campaign in the 1988 plebiscite that ultimately voted Augusto Pinochet out of power. No premiered in the Directors' Fortnight section at the 2012 Cannes Film Festival, where it won the Art Cinema Award for Best Director. The film was nominated for Best Foreign Language Film at the 85th Academy Awards, being the first Chilean nomination in the category. Alongside Tony Manero and Post Mortem, No has been considered a part of an "unintentional trilogy" by Larraín, with all three films being centered around stories set during Augusto Pinochet's dictatorship. Larraín has said, "In Chile, the right, as part of the Pinochet government, is directly responsible for what happened to culture during those years, not only by destroying it or restricting its spread, but also through its persecution of writers and artists." He stated that "Chile found itself unable to express itself, artistically, for nearly twenty years" and also felt that "the right wing, throughout the world, is not very interested in culture, and this reveals the ignorance that is probably theirs, because it is difficult for someone to make the most of something or to enjoy it, if you have no knowledge of it".

In 2013, Larraín served as a member of the jury for the official competition at the 70th Venice International Film Festival. On 24 March 2014, The Wrap reported that Larraín was in negotiations to direct a new film version of Scarface for Universal Studios, with Paul Attanasio writing the script. The new version will be set in modern-day Los Angeles and would revolve around a Mexican immigrant rising in the criminal underworld. However, Larraín left the project.

Larraín's next film, The Club, centers around four Catholic priests who live in a secluded Chilean beach town, the film premiered at the 65th Berlin International Film Festival, where it won the Silver Bear Grand Jury Prize. The film received a nomination for Best Foreigh Language Film at the 73rd Golden Globe Awards.

In 2016, Larrain reteamed with Bernal for Neruda, about the famous Chilean poet and politician Pablo Neruda during his years of exile. Neruda was also nominated for the Golden Globe Award for Best Foreign Language Film. That same year, Larrain made his English-language debut with the Jacqueline Kennedy Onassis biopic Jackie, starring Natalie Portman, Peter Sarsgaard, Greta Gerwig, Richard E. Grant, Billy Crudup, and John Hurt. The film received critical acclaim, with Jackie scoring numerous accolades, including Academy Award, Golden Globe, and SAG Award nominations for Portman, and winning the Platform Prize at the 2016 Toronto International Film Festival. In 2019, Larraín directed Ema, starring Mariana Di Girolamo and Gael García Bernal. The film premiered at the 76th Venice International Film Festival.

=== 2020s ===
In 2020, Larraín participated in the anthology series, Homemade, the series was released on Netflix and consists of several short films following stories during the COVID-19 pandemic, directed by various directors of the world, such as Ladj Ly, Sebastián Lelio, and Rachel Morrison, among others, Larraín directed the short film "Last Call,” starring Chilean actors Jaime Vadell, Mercedes Morán, Delfina Guzmán and Coca Guazzini.

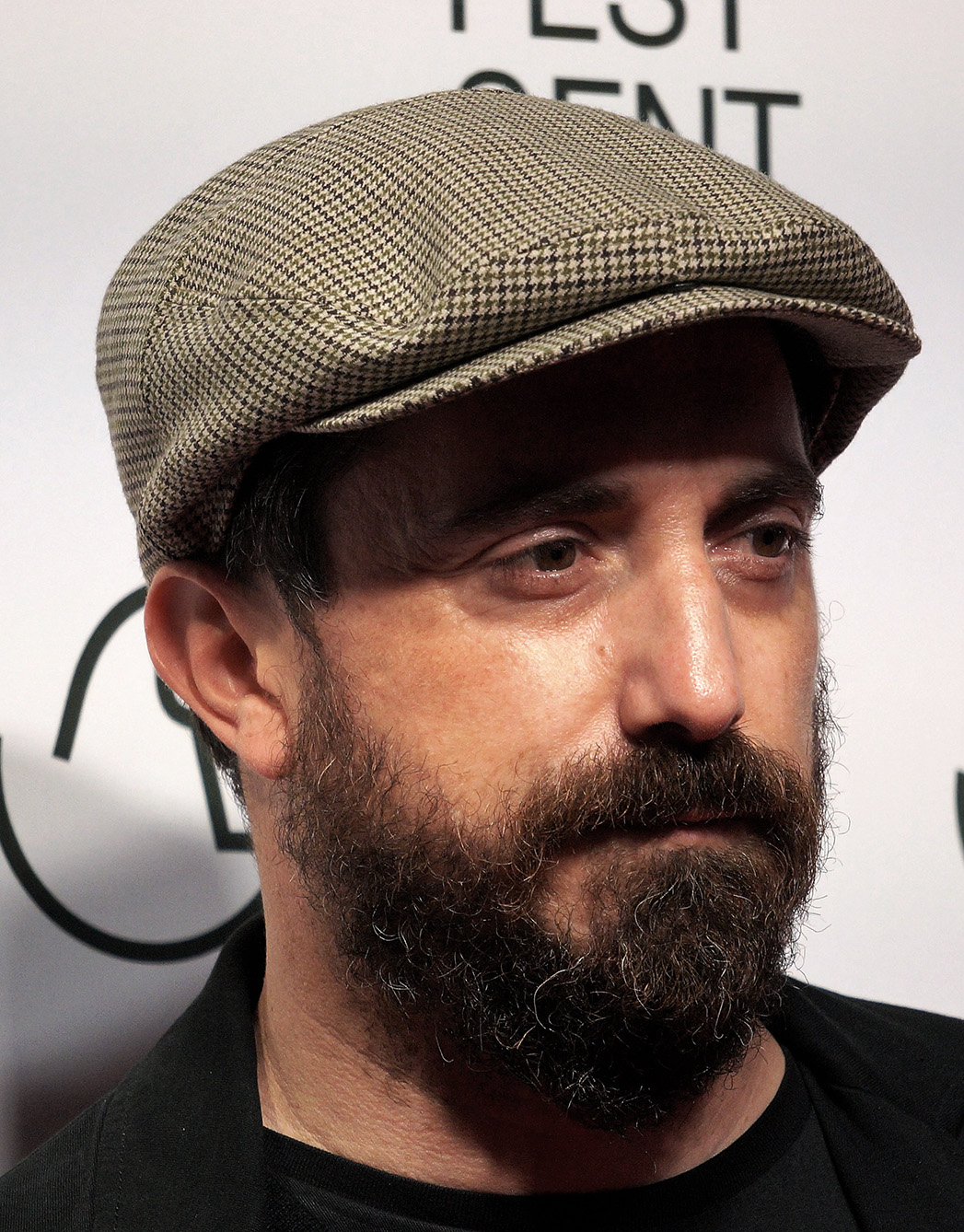
Larraín in 2021

In 2021, Larraín directed his second English-language film, Spencer, a Princess Diana biopic starring Kristen Stewart in the titular role. The film premiered at the 78th Venice Film Festival and received critical acclaim, with Stewart's performance being lauded by critics and received nominations for the Golden Globe, Critics Choice and Academy Award for Best Actress, apart from receiving several other accolades from regional critics' groups.

In 2023, Larraín wrote, directed and produced El Conde, a black comedy and horror film that imagines Augusto Pinochet as a vampire. The film competed at the 80th Venice International Film Festival, where Larraín and co-writer Guillermo Calderón won the Award for Best Screenplay. He also produced a Chilean documentary film directed by Maite Alberdi named The Eternal Memory, which was selected in the World Cinema Documentary Competition at the 2023 Sundance Film Festival. The film earned an Academy Award nomination for Best Documentary Feature Film.

In 2024, Larraín directed and produced Maria, his eleventh feature film, starring Angelina Jolie as opera singer Maria Callas and focusing on the final days of Callas's life in 1970s Paris. The film premiered on 29 August 2024 in competition at the 81st Venice International Film Festival. The film received critical acclaim, which singled out Jolie's performance for praise and received nominations for the Golden Globe and Critics Choice Award for Best actress. Maria completed a trilogy of films by Larraín centered on prominent twentieth-century women, following Jackie, about Jacqueline Kennedy Onassis, and Spencer, about Diana, Princess of Wales.

In 2026, Larraín wrote and directed the Spanish-language Netflix miniseries My Sad Dead, which premiered in September. In June 2026, Larraín was announced to be writing and directing a Chilean period drama film for Netflix titled Once (lit. 'eleven'), which will be set during the 1973 Chilean coup d'etat and following an ensemble cast through 11 intertwined stories. He described his project as "a war movie", and will co-write the screenplay with writing partner Guillermo Calderón. Rodrigo Prieto and Guy Hendrix Dyas will be brought on as cinematographer and production designer respectively, while visual effects will be handled by Andrew Jackson, a frequent collaborator of Christopher Nolan.

== Personal life ==
He was married to the Chilean actress Antonia Zegers from 2008 to 2014. They have two children together. In the 2013 Chilean elections, Larraín supported Michelle Bachelet's center-left presidential candidacy, despite the fact that his parents are members of the conservative right-wing party, the Independent Democratic Union.

== Favorite films ==
In 2012, Larraín participated in the Sight & Sound film polls of that year. Held every ten years to select the greatest films of all time, contemporary directors were asked to select ten films of their choice.

- 2001: A Space Odyssey, Stanley Kubrick, 1968
- 8½, Federico Fellini, 1963
- Apocalypse Now, Francis Ford Coppola, 1979)
- Ivan's Childhood, Andrei Tarkovsky, 1962
- Ordet, Carl Theodor Dreyer, 1955
- Rashomon, Akira Kurosawa, 1950
- Tokyo Story, Yasujirō Ozu, 1953
- Sunset Boulevard, Billy Wilder, 1950
- Vertigo, Alfred Hitchcock, 1958
- Vivre sa vie, Jean-Luc Godard, 1962

In 2021, his list of the Criterion Collection Top 10 films was:

- Barry Lyndon, Stanley Kubrick, 1975
- A Woman Under the Influence, John Cassavetes, 1974
- Beau travail, Claire Denis, 1999
- Belle de jour, Luis Buñuel, 1967
- Elevator to the Gallows, Louis Malle, 1958
- Paris, Texas, Wim Wenders, 1984
- Persona, Ingmar Bergman, 1966
- Blowup, Michelangelo Antonioni, 1966
- Close-Up, Abbas Kiarostami, 1990
- Teorema, Pier Paolo Pasolini, 1968

== Filmography ==
=== Film ===
| Year | Title | Director | Writer | Producer |
|---|---|---|---|---|
| 2006 | Fuga | Yes | Yes | No |
| 2008 | Tony Manero | Yes | Yes | No |
| 2010 | Post Mortem | Yes | Yes | No |
| 2012 | No | Yes | No | No |
| 2015 | The Club | Yes | Yes | No |
| 2016 | Neruda | Yes | No | No |
| 2016 | Jackie | Yes | No | No |
| 2019 | Ema | Yes | Yes | No |
| 2021 | Spencer | Yes | No | Yes |
| 2023 | El Conde | Yes | Yes | Yes |
| 2024 | Maria | Yes | No | Yes |
| TBA | Once | Yes | Yes | Yes |

Producer only

- Ulysses (2011)
- 4:44 Last Day on Earth (2011)
- The Year of the Tiger (2011)
- Young & Wild (2012)
- Barrio Universitario (2013)
- Crystal Fairy & the Magical Cactus (2013)
- Gloria (2013)
- Nasty Baby (2015)
- A Fantastic Woman (2017)
- Gloria Bell (2018)
- Homeless (2019)
- Nobody Knows I'm Here (2020)
- Fever Dream (2021)
- Burning Patience (2022)
- The Eternal Memory (2023)
- Sayen (2023)
- Sorcery (2023)
- In Her Place (2024)
- The Luckiest Man in America (2024)
- Rich Flu (2024)
- The Wave (2025)
- Wild Horse Nine (2026)

=== Television ===
| Year | Title | Director | Producer | Writer | Notes |
|---|---|---|---|---|---|
| 2011–2013 | Prófugos | Yes | Yes | No | Directed 19 episodes |
| 2019–2022 | La jauría | No | Yes | No | 2 seasons |
| 2020–2022 | El Presidente | No | Executive | No | 2 seasons |
| 2020 | Homemade | Yes | Yes | Yes | Wrote and directed episode "Last Call" |
| 2021 | Lisey's Story | Yes | Executive | No | Directed 8 episodes |
| 2022–2024 | Señorita 89 | No | Yes | No | 2 seasons |
| 2022 | 42 Days of Darkness | No | Yes | No | Miniseries |
| 2022 | El Refugio | No | Executive | No | Miniseries |
| 2024–2025 | Baby Bandito | No | Executive | No | 2 seasons |
| 2024 | Midnight Family | No | Yes | No | Miniseries |
| 2025 | Mussolini: Son of the Century | No | Executive | No | Miniseries |
| 2026 | Alguien tiene que saber | No | Executive | No | Miniseries |
| 2026 | The House of the Spirits | No | Executive | No | Miniseries |
| 2026 | My Sad Dead | Yes | Yes | Yes | Directed 4 episodes |

== Awards and nominations ==
| Year | Association | Category | Work | Result | Ref. |
|---|---|---|---|---|---|
| 2009 | Ariel Awards | Best Ibero-American Film | Tony Manero | Nominated | |
| 2010 | Venice International Film Festival | Golden Lion | Post Mortem | Nominated | |
| 2012 | Academy Awards | Best Foreign Language Film | No | Nominated | |
| 2012 | Cannes Film Festival | Art Cinema Award | No | Won | |
| 2013 | Ariel Awards | Best Ibero-American Film | No | Nominated | |
| 2014 | Independent Spirit Awards | John Cassavetes Award | Crystal Fairy & the Magical Cactus | Nominated | |
| 2015 | Berlin International Film Festival | Golden Bear | The Club | Nominated | |
| 2015 | Berlin International Film Festival | Grand Jury Prize | The Club | Won | |
| 2015 | Golden Globe Awards | Best Foreigh Language Film | The Club | Nominated | |
| 2016 | Ariel Awards | Best Ibero-American Film | The Club | Nominated | |
| 2016 | Platino Awards | Best Director | The Club | Nominated | |
| 2016 | Platino Awards | Best Screenplay | The Club | Won | |
| 2016 | Chicago Film Critics Association Awards | Best Director | Jackie | Nominated | |
| 2016 | IndieWire Critics Poll | Best Director | Jackie | 6th Place | |
| 2016 | Online Film Critics Society Awards | Best Director | Jackie | Nominated | |
| 2016 | Toronto International Film Festival | Platform Prize | Jackie | Won | |
| 2016 | Venice Film Festival | Golden Lion | Jackie | Nominated | |
| 2016 | Golden Globe Awards | Best Foreigh Language Film | Neruda | Nominated | |
| 2016 | Critics' Choice Awards | Best Foreign Language Film | Neruda | Nominated | |
| 2017 | Platino Awards | Best Director | Neruda | Nominated | |
| 2017 | Dorian Awards | Director of the Year | Jackie | Nominated | |
| 2017 | Independent Spirit Awards | Best Director | Jackie | Nominated | |
| 2017 | Satellite Awards | Best Director | Jackie | Nominated | |
| 2017 | Dublin Film Critics' Circle | Best Director | Jackie | Nominated | |
| 2019 | Venice International Film Festival | Golden Lion | Ema | Nominated | |
| 2019 | San Sebastián International Film Festival | City of Donostia Audience Award | Ema | Nominated | |
| 2021 | Venice International Film Festival | Golden Lion | Spencer | Nominated | |
| 2021 | Hamilton Behind the Camera Awards | Director Award | Spencer | Won | |
| 2022 | Hollywood Critics Association Film Awards | Best Picture | Spencer | Nominated | |
| 2022 | Hollywood Critics Association Film Awards | Best Director | Spencer | Nominated | |
| 2023 | Venice Film Festival | Golden Lion | El Conde | Nominated | |
| 2023 | Venice Film Festival | Best Screenplay | El Conde | Won | |
| 2024 | Venice Film Festival | Golden Lion | Maria | Nominated | |
| 2024 | Celebration of Latino Cinema & Television | Director Award - Film | Maria | Won | |
| 2024 | Cinema for Peace Awards | The Most Valuable Film of the Year | El Conde | Nominated | |

Awards and nominations received by Larraín's films
| Year | Title | Academy Awards | | BAFTA Awards | | Golden Globe Awards | |
| Year | Title | Nominations | Wins | Nominations | Wins | Nominations | Wins |
|---|---|---|---|---|---|---|---|
| 2013 | No | 1 | | | | | |
| 2016 | The Club | | | | | 1 | |
| 2017 | Neruda | | | | | 1 | |
| 2017 | Jackie | 3 | | 3 | 1 | 1 | |
| 2022 | Spencer | 1 | | | | 1 | |
| 2024 | El Conde | 1 | | | | | |
| 2025 | Maria | 1 | | | | 1 | |
| Total | | 7 | | 3 | 1 | 5 | |

Actors' awarded performances

Under Larraín's direction, these actors have received the Academy Award nominations for their performances in their respective films.

| Year | Performer | Role | Film | Result | Ref. |
Academy Award for Best Actress
| 2017 | Natalie Portman | Jacqueline "Jackie" Kennedy | Jackie | Nominated | |
| 2022 | Kristen Stewart | Diana, Princess of Wales | Spencer | Nominated | |
