= Ministry of Housing and Urbanism (Chile) =

Government ministry of Chile

- Ministerio de Vivienda y Urbanismo
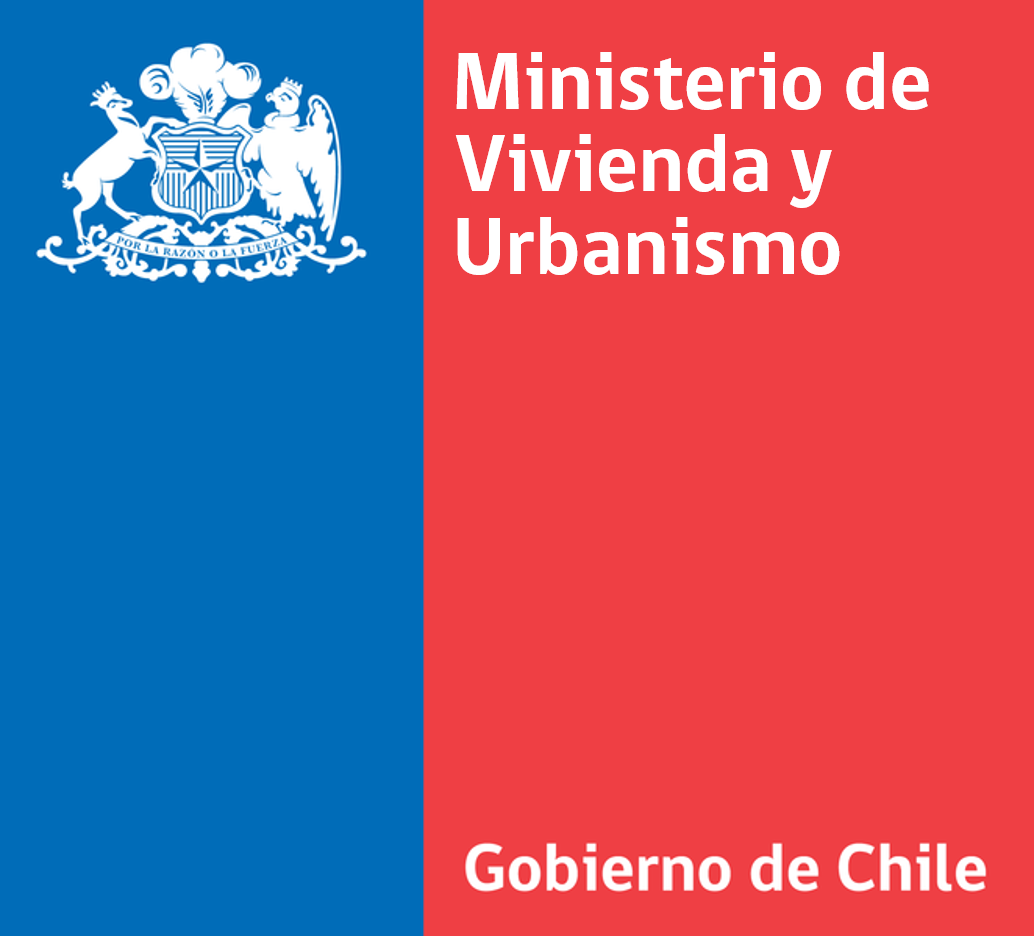

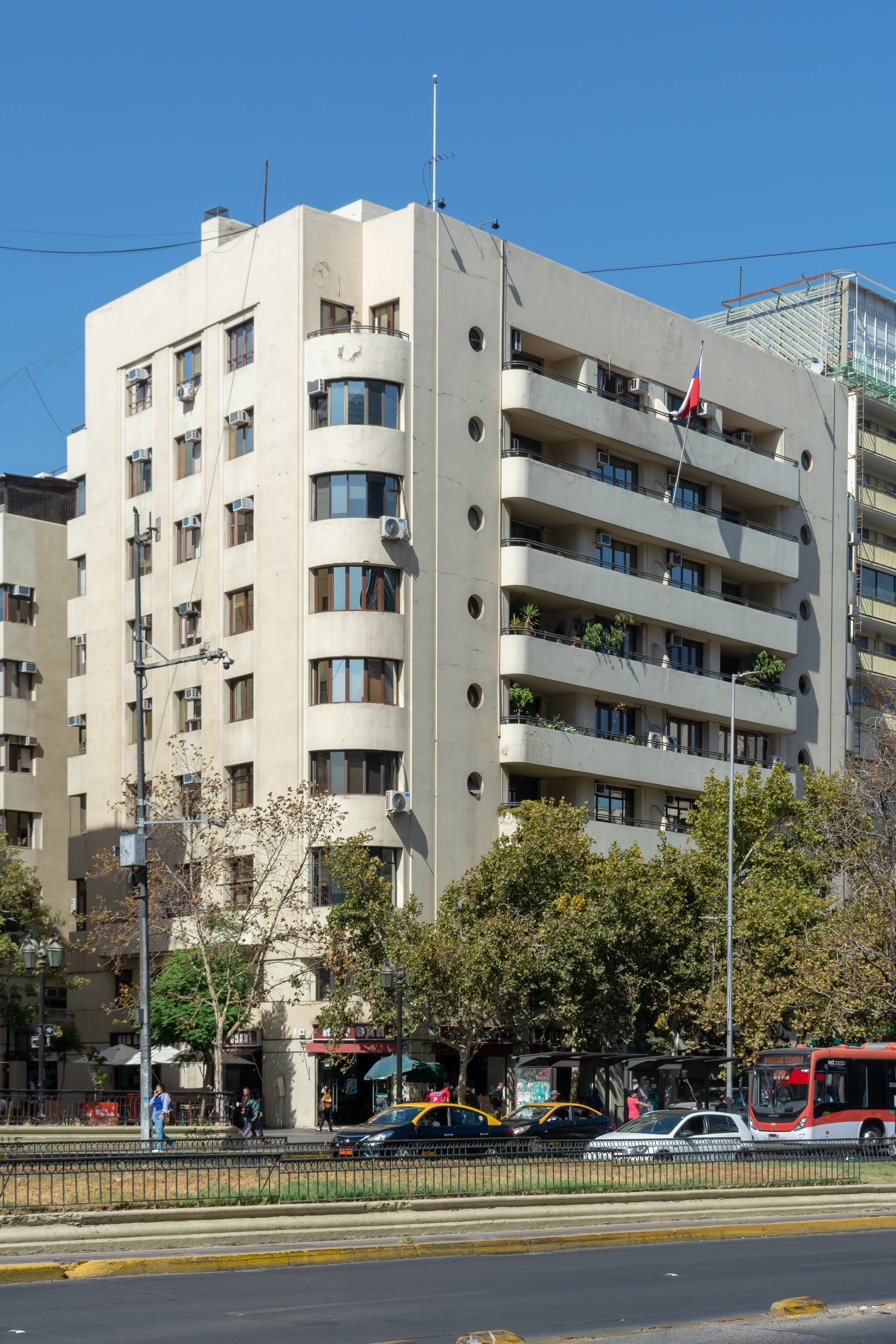
- Headquarters of Ministry of Housing and Urban Development in Santiago

Ministry overview
- Formed: 16 December 1965
- Jurisdiction: Government of Chile
- Headquarters: La Alameda 924, Santiago
- Employees: 6,331 (2025)
- Annual budget: 6,673,426,789 CLP (2026)
- Ministry executives: Iván Poduje, Minister of Housing and Urbanism; Natalia Aguilar, Undersecretary of Housing and Urbanism
- Website: www.minvu.cl

The Ministry of Housing and Urbanism (Spanish: Ministerio de Vivienda y Urbanismo, MINVU) is an institution in charge of the planning, development and urbanization of inhabited or habitable spaces in Chile.

Its current minister is Iván Poduje.

== History ==
=== Government of Eduardo Frei Montalva (Creation) ===
By the early 1960s, there were at least 28 institutions under eight ministries that intervened in matters of housing, urban development, and infrastructure. To address this situation, in 1965, during the government of Eduardo Frei Montalva, Law No. 16,391 was enacted, creating the Ministry of Housing and Urban Development. Together with the Housing Corporation (Corporación de la Vivienda, Corvi) and the Housing Services Corporation (Corporación de Servicios Habitacionales, Corhabit), it incorporated the Urban Improvement Corporation (Corporación de Mejoramiento Urbano, Cormu), an autonomous state-owned company whose main functions included improving and renewing deteriorated areas of cities through rehabilitation and urban development programs.

On the other hand, the first “Intercommunal Regulatory Plan of Santiago” (Plan Regulador Intercomunal de Santiago) was approved, which adjusted urban growth by protecting agricultural areas and ecology. Zoning was established to build industrial neighborhoods and a suburban belt. The basic regional, intercommunal, and communal transport and road network was defined. Green space systems were regulated, as well as the creation of civic and commercial multicenters, and the protection of land reserves for major metropolitan facilities.

Following this approach, the Frei Montalva government set out to reduce the housing deficit, which was considered from a comprehensive perspective, integrating housing into a neighborhood and viewing it as a reflection of a particular way of life. Thus, popular housing programs incorporated schools, healthcare centers, and sports fields, among other facilities. It was considered that solving the housing problem required the participation of the beneficiary families.

=== Government of Salvador Allende ===
In 1971, one of the central objectives of the government of Salvador Allende regarding housing policy was to build and repair substandard housing and improve urban conditions for the poorest sectors. For this reason, the regulations governing housing applications and allocations were modified through the so-called Plan de Ahorro Popular (“Popular Savings Plan.")

=== Dictatorship of Augusto Pinochet ===
At the end of 1973, the Ministry of Housing and Urban Development (Minvu) was reorganized, along with its dependent services: Corvi, Corhabit, Cormu, Cou, the Central Savings and Loans Fund, and the Santiago and El Canelo Water Supply Companies. The Primera Política de Desarrollo Urbano para Santiago (“First Urban Development Policy for Santiago”) was approved, eliminating limits on urban expansion and on the development of the city and its infrastructure, giving way to a free land market.

By 1976, the Minvu was restructured and regionalized, with territorial decentralization through a Metropolitan Ministerial Secretariat. Regional Ministerial Secretariats (Secretarías Regionales Ministeriales, Seremis) and Urban Development Departments were created in all regions of the country. The four corporations—Corhabit, Cormu, Corvi, and Cou were merged, establishing a regional Housing and Urban Development Service (Servicio de Vivienda y Urbanización, Serviu) in the Metropolitan Area and throughout Chile. A new Ley General de Urbanismo y Construcciones (“General Law on Urban Planning and Construction”) was also enacted by supreme decree.

In 1979, the so-called “National Urban Development Policy” (Política Nacional de Desarrollo Urbano, PNDU) was approved, which sought to harmonize sectoral guidelines with the overall policy of economic and social organization known as the social market economy. This policy asserted that:

- Urban land was not a scarce resource.
- Flexible planning systems with minimal state intervention were necessary.
- Procedures had to be defined and restrictions removed to allow the natural growth of urban areas, following market trends.

The Intercommunal Plan of Santiago was modified.

In 1981, the Minvu made significant changes to its programs by expanding the regulations of the newly created Variable Housing Subsidy. This measure gave rise to the Programa de Vivienda Básica (“Basic Housing Program,”) which contemplated a system of variable subsidies and considered basic housing as the first step toward social housing.

By 1982, municipalities were authorized to build low-cost housing and sanitary units, which were required to have a built area of 18 square meters and a cost of less than 220 UF. The sanitary unit also had to have a minimum area of 6 square meters (bathroom and kitchen) and a maximum cost of 110 UF.

In 1984, the Minvu modified the basic housing system to expand its coverage to segments that had been excluded from the program, such as extended-family residents (allegados). Until 1983, housing had been allocated to people living in marginal neighborhoods and camps identified on Minvu and municipal maps. During this period, the Serviu opened a new permanent application system based on the “CAS Card,” and also incorporated savings and the number of family dependents. Basic housing assigned through this system could receive a subsidy equivalent to 75% of the value of the dwelling, not exceeding 180 UF. By 1985, the number of registered applicant families had reached 170,000.

In 1985, the “Urban Development Policy” was adjusted through Supreme Decree No. 31, which stated that:

- Urban land is a scarce resource.
- Property rights may be restricted in the interest of the common good.
- Free initiative and the market must be subject to state planning. It is necessary to promote intensive land use in consolidated areas in order to avoid outward urban sprawl.

Based on studies financed through a World Bank loan, in 1987 the regime redefined and simplified its programs to improve the targeting of housing subsidies toward the most needy population.

=== Government of Patricio Aylwin ===
During the government of Patricio Aylwin (1990–1994), improvements and changes were made to expand access to housing programs, decentralization was deepened for the allocation of housing resources, and changes were introduced to the financing system. The government also initiated a national consultation to develop a new “Urban Policy,” through which the new “Metropolitan Regulatory Plan of Santiago” (Plan Regulador Metropolitano de Santiago, PRMS) was approved.

=== Government of Eduardo Frei Ruiz-Tagle ===
In 1997, during the mid-term of the government of Eduardo Frei Ruiz-Tagle, the PRMS was modified, introducing the Urbanizable Zones with Conditioned Development (Zonas Urbanizables con Desarrollo Condicionado, ZUDC). To implement this, the Committee of Ministers for Urban Development and Territorial Planning was created, composed of the ministers of Housing and Urban Development, Public Works, National Assets, Agriculture, Transport, and Telecommunications. The Minvu’s Urban Projects Directorate was also created.

The Frei Ruiz-Tagle administration was characterized by the mass scale of state action, greater urban integration of housing programs, and diversification of housing financing alternatives. During this period, innovations and improvements to the network of ministerial programs stood out.

=== Government of Ricardo Lagos ===
At the beginning of the government of Ricardo Lagos in 2000, the “Consejo Nacional para la Reforma Urbana" (National Council for Urban Reform) was established, initiating a process of reflection and change in Chilean cities. The Bicentennial Committee was also created. Looking ahead to 2010, four regional capitals were to be “rethought”: Antofagasta, Valparaíso, Santiago, and Concepción. Supreme Decree No. 75 was issued, corresponding to a Nueva Ordenanza General de Urbanismo y Construcciones (New General Ordinance on Urban Planning and Construction,) and Decree No. 245 was approved, regulating the “Competitive Program for Public Space Works,” to be carried out in neighborhoods of a heritage character located in consolidated urban sectors whose rehabilitation or recovery was necessary due to evident deterioration or abandonment.

Within this framework, in 2003 Law No. 19,865 on Shared Urban Financing was enacted, through which the Serviu and municipalities could enter into participation contracts with third parties for the acquisition of assets or the execution and maintenance of urban works in exchange for compensation. The “Committee of Ministers for the City and Territory” was created—within the framework of state reform and modernization—as well as the Bicentennial Committee of Ministers.

During the final years of the government, between 2004 and 2005, emphasis was placed on the pursuit of equal opportunities and on concentrating action on the most vulnerable groups in order to meet their basic needs with greater dignity. It was the task of the Minvu to contribute to building a supportive and equitable city capable of welcoming all the families who inhabit it. In this direction fell housing programs, urban roadworks, participatory paving, community facilities, and urban parks, as well as the formulation of planning norms and instruments aimed at achieving harmonious coexistence.

=== First Government of Michelle Bachelet ===
During the first government of Michelle Bachelet (2006–2010), the new housing policy that the Minvu began applying from the first year of her mandate aimed to achieve improvements in housing quality and social integration, which made it possible to reduce the housing deficit among the poorest 20% of the population. At this stage, the size of social housing units was increased, while also ensuring construction quality. Efforts were also made to reverse social segregation in the city by improving the stock of existing houses and neighborhoods, and by assisting middle-income sectors that needed state support to obtain homeownership. During this period, 446,000 families received subsidies to acquire or build their homes.

=== First Government of Sebastián Piñera ===
Following the earthquake and tsunami that affected the central-southern zone of the country in March 2010, shortly after the beginning of the first government of Sebastián Piñera, the "Chile Unido Reconstruye Mejor" (Chile United Rebuilds Better) plan was created. It sought to generate an opportunity to redefine the future development of several urban centers, which would be planned in an integrated and sustainable manner, taking natural risks into account.

== Mission ==
According to its website, the Ministry of Housing and Urban Development states that its mission is to

"recuperar la ciudad, poniendo en el centro de su misión la integración social, avanzando hacia una calidad de vida urbana y habitacional, que responda no solo a las nuevas necesidades y demandas de los chilenos, sino también al compromiso con la sostenibilidad de la inversión pública, el medioambiente y la economía del país, con foco en la calidad de vida de las personas más vulnerables, pero también de los sectores medios".

“restore the city, placing social integration at the core of its mission, moving toward an urban and housing quality of life that responds not only to the new needs and demands of Chileans, but also to the commitment to the sustainability of public investment, the environment, and the country’s economy, with a focus on the quality of life of the most vulnerable people, as well as the middle sectors.”

== Organisation ==
The MINVU is made up of:

- the Undersecretariat of Housing;
- 16 Regional Ministerial Secretariats (SEREMI) of Housing;
- 16 Housing and Urban Development Services (SERVIU);
- and the Administration of the Metropolitan Park of Santiago (Parque Metropolitano de Santiago, Parquemet).

== List of representatives ==
Minister	Party	Term start	Term end	President
Modesto Collados	Independent	16 December 1965	10 August 1966	Eduardo Frei Montalva
Juan Hamilton	DC	10 August 1966	9 October 1968	Eduardo Frei Montalva
Andrés Donoso	DC	9 October 1968	3 November 1970	Eduardo Frei Montalva
Carlos Cortés Díaz	PS	3 November 1970	17 September 1971	Salvador Allende
Julio Benítez Castillo	Independent	17 September 1971	28 January 1972	Salvador Allende
Orlando Cantuarias	Independent	28 January 1972	17 June 1972	Salvador Allende
Luis Matte Valdés	Independent	17 June 1972	9 August 1973	Salvador Allende
Aníbal Palma	Radical Party	9 August 1973	28 August 1973	Salvador Allende
Pedro Felipe Ramírez	Christian Left	28 August 1973	11 September 1973	Salvador Allende
Arturo Vivero	Military	12 September 1973	11 July 1974	Augusto Pinochet
Arturo Troncoso	Military	12 July 1974	14 April 1975	Augusto Pinochet
Carlos Granifo	Military	14 April 1975	11 March 1977	Augusto Pinochet
Luis Edmundo Ruiz	Military	11 March 1977	26 December 1978	Augusto Pinochet
Jaime Estrada Leigh	Independent	26 December 1978	22 April 1982	Augusto Pinochet
Roberto Guillard Marinot	Independent	22 April 1982	10 August 1983	Augusto Pinochet
Modesto Collados	Independent	10 August 1983	2 April 1984	Augusto Pinochet
Miguel Ángel Poduje	Independent	2 April 1984	21 October 1988	Augusto Pinochet
Gustavo Montero Saavedra	Independent	21 October 1988	11 March 1990	Augusto Pinochet
Alberto Etchegaray Aubry	Independent	11 March 1990	11 March 1994	Patricio Aylwin
Edmundo Hermosilla	DC	11 March 1994	24 July 1997	Eduardo Frei Ruíz-Tagle
Sergio Henríquez	Independent	24 March 1997	11 March 2000	Eduardo Frei Ruíz-Tagle
Claudio Orrego	DC	11 March 2000	29 September 2000	Ricardo Lagos
Jaime Ravinet	DC	29 December 2000	29 September 2004	Ricardo Lagos
Sonia Tschorne	PS	29 September 2004	11 March 2006	Ricardo Lagos
Patricia Poblete	DC	11 March 2006	11 March 2010	Michelle Bachelet
Magdalena Matte	UDI	11 March 2010	19 April 2011	Sebastián Piñera
Rodrigo Pérez Mackenna	UDI	19 April 2011	11 March 2014	Sebastián Piñera
Paulina Saball	PPD	11 March 2014	11 March 2018	Michelle Bachelet
Cristián Monckeberg	RN	11 March 2018	4 June 2020	Sebastián Piñera
Felipe Ward	UDI	4 June 2020	11 March 2022	Sebastián Piñera
Carlos Montes Cisternas		11 March 2022	11 March 2026	Gabriel Boric
Iván Poduje	Ind.	11 March 2026	Incumbent	José Antonio Kast
