= Homeless (film) =

- Theatrical release poster
- Directed by: Jorge Campusano; José Ignacio Navarro; Santiago O'Ryan
- Screenplay by: Jorge Campusano; José Ignacio Navarro; Santiago O'Ryan
- Based on: Homeless by José Ignacio Navarro
- Produced by: Pablo Larraín; Juan de Dios Larraín; José Ignacio Navarro
- Starring: Iván Fernández; Elliot Leguizamo; Bernardo Rodríguez; Sebastian Rosas; Emiliano Vanosa; Gerardo Vázquez
- Edited by: Javier Estévez
- Music by: Pablo Borghi
- Production companies: Fábula; Laurent Lunes
- Release dates: June 14, 2019 (Annecy); August 29, 2019 (Chile)
- Running time: 88 minutes
- Countries: Chile; Argentina
- Language: Spanish
- Budget: $600.000

Homeless, also known as Homeless: The Movie, is a 2019 adult animated science fiction satirical black comedy film written and directed by Jorge Campusano, José Ignacio Navarro and Santiago O'Ryan in their directorial debut. It is based on the television series of the same name by José Ignacio Navarro.

== Synopsis ==
When the worst global financial crisis in history breaks loose, a group of fringe vagrants confront the dictatorship of the last society still standing. The drifters want to restore the system, the one they despise so much, so they can put their camp under a bridge.

== Cast ==
The actors participating in this film are:

- Iván Fernández as Germán
- Elliot Leguizamo as Mickey Rata
- Bernardo Rodríguez as Jackie
- Sebastian Rosas as Raúl
- Emiliano Vanosa as Quesilla
- Gerardo Vázquez as Waldo Alegría

== Release ==
Homeless had its world premiere on June 14, 2019, at the Annecy International Animation Film Festival. It was released commercially on August 29, 2019, in Chilean theaters.

== Reception ==
=== Critical reception ===
Ezequiel Boetti from Página 12 wrote: "Homeless is a valuable film in its punk and disruptive intent, although it is not completely round in its execution."

=== Accolades ===
Year	Award / Festival	Category	Recipient	Result	Ref.
2019	Annecy International Animation Film Festival	Contrechamp Section - Best Film	Homeless	Nominated	
2020	Quirino Awards	Best Ibero-American Animated Feature Film	Homeless	Nominated	
2021	Havana Film Festival	Best Animated Film	Homeless	Won	
