= Patricia Matte =

Chilean sociologist

- Born: 1942 or 1943 (age 82–83)
- Education: Pontificia Universidad Catolica de Chile
- Spouse: married
- Children: 4
- Parent: Eliodoro Matte Ossa
- Relatives: Eliodoro Matte (brother); Bernardo Matte (brother)

Patricia Matte Larraín (born 1942/1943) is a Chilean sociologist and billionaire, a major shareholder in the Chilean forestry and paper company CMPC, founded by her father.

As of October 2015, Forbes estimated her net worth at US$2.8 billion.

She is married, with four children: María Patricia Larraín Matte, María Magdalena Larraín Matte, Jorge Bernardo Larraín Matte, and Jorge Gabriel Larraín Matte.
