= Jaime Ravinet =

Chilean politician, lawyer, academic and businessman

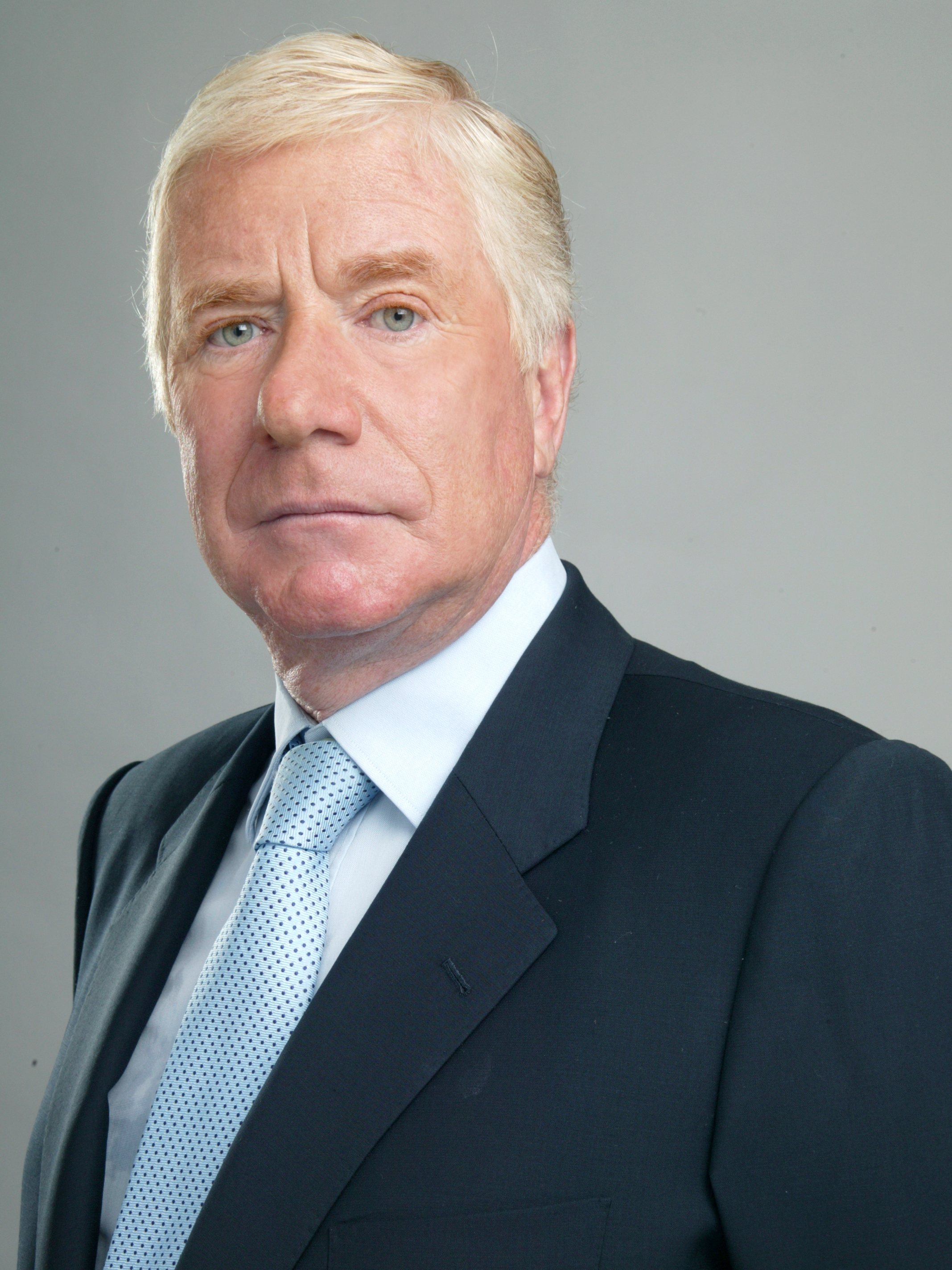
- Jaime Ravinet, in 2010

Minister of Defense
- In office 11 March 2010 – 13 January 2011
- President: Sebastián Piñera
- Preceded by: Francisco Vidal
- Succeeded by: Andrés Allamand
- In office 29 September 2004 – 11 March 2006
- President: Ricardo Lagos
- Preceded by: Michelle Bachelet
- Succeeded by: Vivianne Blanlot

Minister of Housing & Urbanism
- In office 29 December 2000 – 29 September 2004
- President: Ricardo Lagos
- Preceded by: Claudio Orrego
- Succeeded by: Sonia Tschorne

Minister of National Assets
- In office 29 December 2000 – 29 September 2004
- President: Ricardo Lagos
- Preceded by: Claudio Orrego
- Succeeded by: Sonia Tschorne

Mayor of Santiago
- In office 11 March 1990 – 6 December 2000
- Preceded by: Máximo Honorato
- Succeeded by: Joaquín Lavín

Personal details
- Born: Jaime Nicolás Ravinet de la Fuente; 17 October 1946 (age 79) Santiago, Metropolitan Region, Chile
- Party: Christian Democratic Party (1961−2010)
- Education: University of Chile; Johns Hopkins University
- Occupation: Lawyer

Jaime Nicolás Ravinet de la Fuente (born 17 October 1946), is a Chilean politician, lawyer, academic and businessman. From 1990 to 2000 he was Mayor of Santiago, before becoming the Minister for Housing, Urban Planning and National Property in 2001, a position he held until 2004. He then became the Minister for Defence until 11 March 2006.

In February 2010 he was re-appointed as Minister of Defence by president-elect Sebastián Piñera but Ravinet resigned on 13 January 2011 after suggesting that the Chilean armed forces might be reluctant to help during humanitarian crises if that forced them to provide information about their expenses.

He was born into a middle-class family, the eldest son of engineer Alfredo Ravinet and Alicia de la Fuente Larenas, who was Ravinet's second wife. He was educated at Santiago College, San Ignacio College and finally the University of Chile, where he studied law. He married political scientist Ximena Lyon Parot in January 1974, and has three children.

== Political career ==
=== Early years ===
At a young age, Ravinet became active as a student leader, particularly during his time at the Federation of Students of the University of Chile (FECh), which he presided over in 1968 and 1969, representing the Christian Democratic Youth. He had previously participated in the 1964 presidential campaign in which Eduardo Frei Montalva was elected President of Chile for the 1964–1970 term.

He later served as chief of staff to the Minister of Mining, Alejandro Hales, during the administration of Eduardo Frei Montalva. During the Popular Unity government (1970–1973), he was an opponent of President Salvador Allende.

He was studying international relations at Johns Hopkins University in the United States on a Fulbright Scholarship when the 1973 coup d’état occurred. He returned to Chile in 1974 without completing those studies.

=== Mayor of Santiago ===
He formally entered national politics by joining Patricio Aylwin’s presidential campaign in 1989 as executive secretary. After Aylwin’s victory in the 1989 presidential election, he was appointed mayor of the Commune of Santiago in 1990.

In 1992 he was elected mayor in direct elections with 38.03% of the vote and was re-elected in 1996 with 45.38%. During his tenure he promoted real estate development aimed at repopulating the commune and implemented measures against street commerce.

During his administration, the former Public Prison was reconverted, Plaza de Armas was renovated, and the former Mapocho Railway Station was transformed into a cultural and events center.

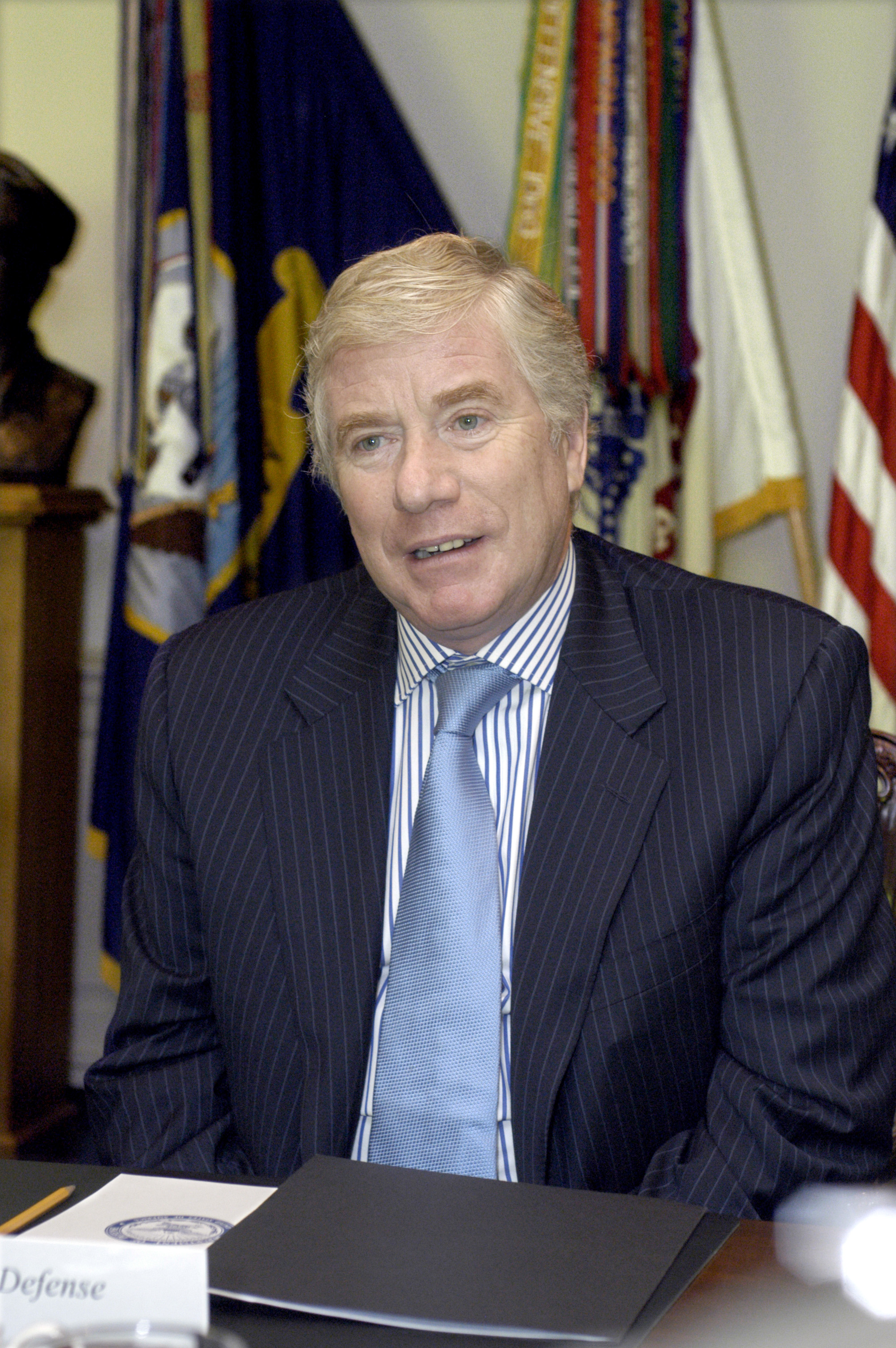
Jaime Ravinet as Minister of National Defense in 2005.

=== Minister under Lagos ===
Shortly after leaving the mayoralty, President Ricardo Lagos appointed him Minister of Housing and Urbanism and Minister of National Assets at the end of 2000.

He remained in office until 2004, when he was appointed Minister of National Defense, succeeding Michelle Bachelet, who was then launching her presidential candidacy.

During his tenure, the modernization of Chile’s military equipment continued, including the acquisition of two new Scorpène-class submarines built for the Chilean State. His period also coincided with renewed maritime boundary tensions with Peru.

=== 2008 mayoral candidacy ===
In 2008 he was the consensus candidate of the Concertación por la Democracia coalition to run again for mayor of Santiago.

He ran against Pablo Zalaquett (Independent Democratic Union), then mayor of La Florida, in the municipal elections of 26 October 2008, losing by more than ten percentage points.

Following the defeat, he resigned from his party’s National Council and suspended his political activity.

=== Minister under Piñera ===
In February 2010, President-elect Sebastián Piñera announced his cabinet, naming Ravinet again as Minister of National Defense. The appointment generated controversy within the Concertación, as his party had warned that members who accepted positions in the incoming administration would be expelled. Ravinet resigned from the party shortly after his appointment.

He remained in office until January 2011, when he was dismissed by President Piñera amid a series of public controversies.

His dismissal represented the first cabinet change of Piñera’s administration.
