= Eliodoro Matte =

Chilean businessman (born 1945)

- Born: 5 November 1945 (age 80)
- Education: Saint George's College, Santiago; Pontificia Universidad Catolica de Chile; Booth School of Business
- Occupations: President, CMPC
- Spouse: Pilar Capdevila
- Children: 3
- Parent: Eliodoro Matte Ossa
- Relatives: Bernardo Matte (brother); Patricia Matte (sister)

Eliodoro Matte Larraín (born 5 November 1945) is a Chilean billionaire businessman, president of the Chilean forestry and paper company CMPC, that he inherited from his father.

Matte was born on 5 November 1945, the son of Eliodoro Matte Ossa. He took on a bachelor's degree in a civil industrial engineering from the University of Chile (without graduating), followed by an MBA from the Booth School of Business, University of Chicago.

He is chairman of the think tank Centro de Estudios Públicos (CEP).

As of October 2015, Forbes estimated his net worth at US$2.7 billion.

He is married to Pilar Capdevila, and they have three children: Eliodoro Matte Capdevila, Jorge Matte Capdevila, and María del Pilar Matte Capdevila.
