= Luis Matte Valdés =

Chilean politician (1933–2019)

Ministry of Housing and Urbanism
- In office 17 June 1972 – 9 August 1973
- President: Salvador Allende
- Preceded by: Orlando Cantuarias
- Succeeded by: Aníbal Palma

Mayor of La Florida
- In office 1961–1964
- Preceded by: Gustavo Alessandri Valdés
- Succeeded by: Carlos Miranda Pérez

Personal details
- Born: 5 April 1933 Valparaíso, Chile
- Died: 4 March 2019 (aged 85) Santiago, Chile
- Party: Liberal Party (–1964); Socialist Party (1964–2019)
- Spouse: Verónica Lira Vergara
- Children: Eight
- Parent(s): Luis Matte Larraín; Elvira Valdés
- Education: University of Notre Dame
- Occupation: Politician
- Profession: Engineer

Luis Matte Valdés (5 April 1933 – 5 March 2019) was a Chilean politician who served as Mayor of La Florida and later as national Minister of Housing and Urbanism in the Presidency of Salvador Allende.
