= Bernardo Matte =

- Born: 1954 or 1955 (age 70–71)
- Education: University of Chile
- Occupations: Chairman of Colbun; President, Banco BICE
- Spouse: Married
- Children: 3
- Parent: Eliodoro Matte Ossa
- Relatives: Eliodoro Matte (brother); Patricia Matte (sister)

Bernardo Matte Larraín (born 1954/1955) is a Chilean billionaire businessman, and a major shareholder in the Chilean forestry and paper company CMPC, founded by his father.

Matter earned a bachelor's degree from the University of Chile.

He is chairman of Colbún S.A., Chile’s third-largest energy producer.

As of March 2019, Forbes estimated his net worth at US$1.0 billion.

He has three children: Bernardo Matte Izquierdo, Sofía Matte Izquierdo, and Francisco Matte Izquierdo.
