= Hernán Larraín =

Chilean politician (born 1947)

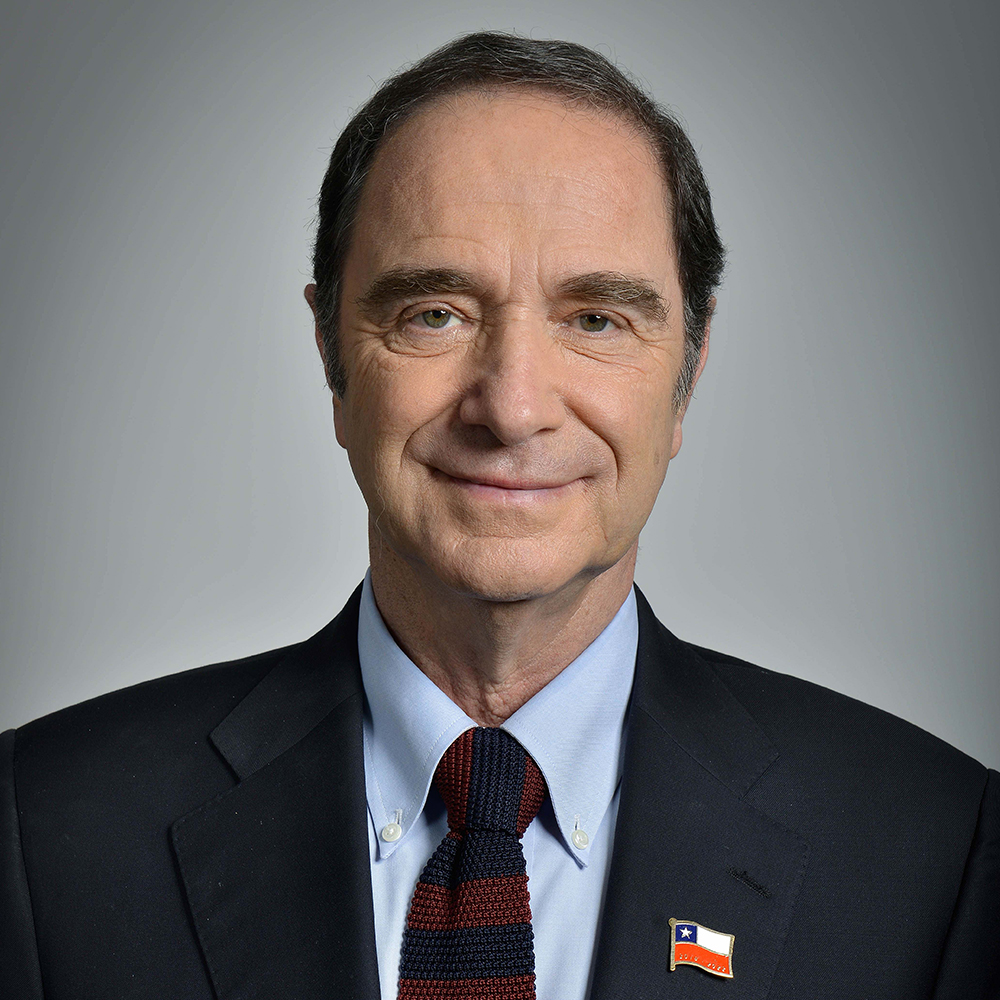

Minister of Justice and Human Rights
- In office 11 March 2018 – 11 March 2022
- President: Sebastián Piñera
- Preceded by: Jaime Campos
- Succeeded by: Marcela Ríos

President of the Senate of Chile
- In office 16 March 2004 – 11 March 2005
- Preceded by: Andrés Zaldívar
- Succeeded by: Sergio Romero

Member of the Senate
- In office 11 March 1994 – 11 March 2018
- Preceded by: Sergio Onofre Jarpa
- Succeeded by: constituency abolished

President of the UDI
- In office 11 April 2015 – 7 January 2017
- Preceded by: Ernesto Silva
- Succeeded by: Jacqueline van Rysselberghe
- In office 1 July 2006 – 5 July 2008
- Preceded by: Jovino Novoa
- Succeeded by: Juan Antonio Coloma Correa

Personal details
- Born: 21 September 1947 (age 79) Santiago, Chile
- Party: Independent Democratic Union
- Spouse: Magdalena Matte Lecaros
- Children: 6 (inc. Pablo Larraín)
- Education: Pontifical Catholic University of Chile
- Profession: Lawyer
- Website: www.hernanlarrain.cl

Hernán Larraín Fernández (born September 21, 1947) is a conservative Chilean lawyer, university lecturer, and politician.

He served as Minister of Justice and Human Rights during the second administration of President Sebastián Piñera between 2018 and 2022. He has also held senior leadership roles within the Independent Democratic Union (UDI), serving as party president on two occasions.

Larraín's former public service positions include a Senate seat representing the 11th district, the Maule Region (1994–2010), the Presidency of the Senate (2004–2005) and the presidency of the Independent Democratic Union (Unión Demócrata Independiente, UDI) from 2006 to 2008 and 2015 to 2017.

Larraín is married to Magdalena Matte, a Chilean civil engineer, businesswoman and politician. They have six children, among them is Pablo Larraín, a well known filmmaker. Hernán Larraín is of Basque descent. He is also a member of Washington D.C.–based think tank the Inter-American Dialogue.

== Early life ==
Larraín was born in Santiago on 21 September 1947. He is the son of Hernán Crescente Larraín Ríos and María Eliana Fernández Beraud.

He is married to Magdalena Matte Lecaros, a civil engineer from the Pontifical Catholic University of Chile (PUC) and former Minister of Housing and Urbanism during the first administration of President Sebastián Piñera. He is the father of six children, including Hernán, a lawyer and former president of the Political Evolution party, and Pablo, a filmmaker.

He completed his primary and secondary education at Saint George's College in Santiago. He later entered the Faculty of Law at the PUC, where he obtained a degree in Legal Sciences with a thesis titled Toward University Institutionalization. He qualified as a lawyer in 1971. That same year, he received a Ford Foundation scholarship to pursue a Master of Laws (LL.M.) degree at the London School of Economics.

=== Professional career ===
Larraín began his professional career at the Pontifical Catholic University of Chile. Between 1971 and 1984, he served as an assistant professor in the Departments of Civil Law and Philosophy of Law. After completing his postgraduate studies, he became a full professor of Introduction to Law and, in 1973, joined the University's Academic Coordination Council.

From 1974 to 1976, he served as Director of Studies and Planning, concurrently holding the position of Vice Rector for Communications until 1979. That year, he moved to the Academic Vice Rectorate, a role he held until April 1986.

In parallel, in 1975, he was appointed a member of the National Television Council, where he served for seven years. During his tenure, he founded one of Canal 13's most prominent educational programs, Teleduc.

In 1986, Larraín worked as editor of the Reportajes section of the newspaper El Mercurio of Santiago. From the following year until 1991, he served as Executive Director of the Andes Foundation. In 1989, he became a member of the Superior Council of the Pontifical Catholic University of Chile for a three-year term.

At the same time, he joined the Editorial Board of the Gabriela Mistral Publishing Company and founded and directed the Revista Universitaria for six years. He also worked as a columnist and contributor for El Mercurio, Revista Ercilla, and Diario Financiero.

He has been a faculty member at the PUC since March 2013.

== Political career ==
Larraín began his political involvement during his university years, serving as president of the Student Federation of the PUC (FEUC) between 1969 and 1970. That same year, he traveled to New York to attend a Congress of Latin American Student Leaders. In 1974, he participated in the Latin American Scholarship Program of American Universities (LAPSAU) in Miami.

He was an active member of the gremialist movement and formally joined the Independent Democratic Union following the assassination of Senator Jaime Guzmán in 1991. That year, he served briefly as president of the party's Doctrinal Congress and later as vice president of the party, a position he held until 1997.

On 1 July 2006, the General Council of the UDI elected him president of the party for the 2006–2008 term. He again served as party president between 11 April 2015 and 7 January 2017.

On 11 March 2018, Larraín was appointed Minister of Justice and Human Rights by President Sebastián Piñera Echenique. He served in that role until the end of the administration on 11 March 2022.

In January 2023, he was appointed by the Senate, in accordance with Law No. 21,533, as a member of the Expert Commission tasked with drafting a preliminary proposal for a new Constitution to be submitted to the Constitutional Council.
