= Augusto Matte Pérez =

Chilean politician, lawyer, and diplomat

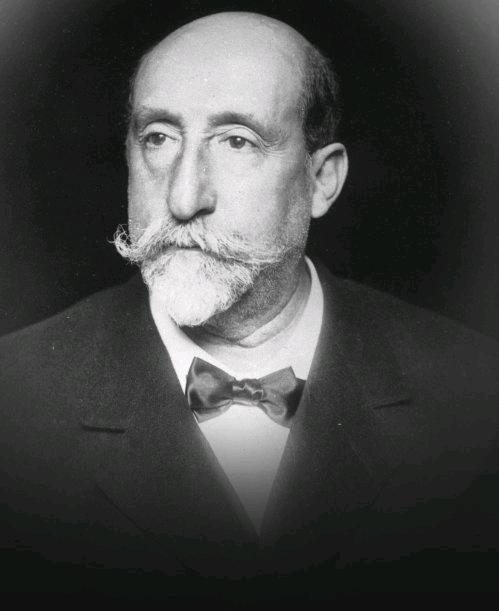

Augusto Matte Pérez (1843 – February 25, 1913) was a Chilean politician, lawyer, diplomat, and a member of the influential Matte family. He was Minister of Finance (1877–1878, 1879–1880) and briefly Minister of Foreign Affairs (1888) of Chile.
