= Empresas CMPC =

Chilean pulp and paper company

Empresas CMPC S.A.
- Type: Sociedad Anónima
- Traded as: BCS: CMPC
- Industry: Pulp and Paper
- Founded: 12 March 1920; 106 years ago
- Headquarters: Santiago, Chile
- Key people: Luis Felipe Gazitua, (Chairman); Francisco Ruiz-Tagle Edwards, (CEO)
- Revenue: ▲US$ 5.1 billion (2017)
- Net income: ▲US$ 103.0 million (2017)
- Number of employees: 17,500 (2015 average)
- Subsidiaries: Forestal Mininco
- Website: www.cmpc.com

Empresas CMPC S.A. (Spanish: Compañía Manufacturera de Papeles y Cartones; popularly known as the “Papelera”) is a Chilean pulp and paper company, headquartered in Santiago, Chile. It is the largest paper manufacturer in the country; and one of the biggest companies worldwide, according to Forbes Global 2000's ranking in 2023, with $1B in profits in 2023.

== About ==
CMPC is engaged in integrated forest industry, which operates as a holding company through four business centers: forestry, pulp, paper and paper products, and tissue. Each of these areas can function independently, being in the holding company for overall coordination and financial management of these businesses. Supplies, computer systems and other related administrative support, are centralized in CMPC SA Shared Services.

The company has operations mainly in the South American countries Chile, Argentina, Brazil, Peru, Colombia, Ecuador, and Uruguay as well as in Mexico in North America. Its main competitors are Suzano (based in Brazil), Arauco (based in Chile), APRIL (based in Indonesia), and Södra (based in Sweden).

== History ==
The company was founded in 1920 as a merger of factories between "Cartón del Maipo" and "Esperanza" and a merge of the businessman Luis Matte Larraín and the German engineer Germán Ebbinghaus.

In 1983, CMPC expanded in to the printing business. In 1992, a partnership was form between CMPC and Simpson Paper Co. to form Celulosa del Pacífico S.A. (CELPAC). In 1995, CMPC purchased 20% of Scott Paper Company in Chile.

They have been subject to many controversies. In 2017, CMPC agreed out of court to compensate consumers who were affected by illegal price fixing on soft paper business (such as toilet, napkins, tissues, diapers, and others).
