= Asbestos law =

Legal and regulatory issues involving the mineral asbestos

Map of countries that have banned the use of asbestos

The mineral asbestos is subject to a wide range of laws and regulations that relate to its production and use, including mining, manufacturing, use and disposal. Injuries attributed to asbestos have resulted in both workers' compensation claims and injury litigation. Health problems attributed to asbestos include asbestosis, mesothelioma, lung cancer, and diffuse pleural thickening.

One of the major issues relating to asbestos in civil proceedings is the latency of asbestos-related diseases. A National Institutes of Health of 421 people reported a latency period of 14 to 72 years from exposure to asbestos to mesothelioma diagnosis. Most countries have limitation periods to bar actions that are taken long after the cause of action has lapsed. For example, in Malaysia the time period to file a tort action is six years from the time the tort occurred. Due to several asbestos-related actions, countries such as Australia have amended their laws relating to limitations to accumulate starting from time of discovery rather than time when the cause of action accrued. The first employee claims for injury from exposure to asbestos in the workplace were made in 1927, and the first lawsuit against an asbestos manufacturer was filed in 1929. Since then, many lawsuits have been filed. As a result of the litigation, manufacturers sold off subsidiaries, diversified, produced asbestos substitutes, and started asbestos removal businesses.

Worldwide, 67 countries and territories (including those in the European Union) have banned the use of asbestos. It is listed as a category of controlled waste under Annex I of the Basel Convention on the Control of Transboundary Movements of Hazardous Wastes and their Disposal [1992]. This means that parties to the convention are required to prohibit the export of hazardous wastes to parties which have prohibited the import of such wastes via the notification procedure in Article 13 of the convention. In places such as India, however, there continues to be a high use of friable or dust-based asbestos in compressed asbestos fiber (CAF) gaskets, ropes, cloth, gland packings, millboards, insulation, brake liners, and other products which are being exported without adequate knowledge and information to the other countries. Asbestos use is prevalent in India because there is no effective enforcement of the rules.

== Background ==
In the late 19th century and early 20th century, asbestos was considered an ideal material for use in the construction industry. It was known to be an excellent fire retardant, to have high electrical resistance, and was inexpensive and easy to use.

The dangers related to asbestos arise mainly when the fibers become airborne and are inhaled. Because of the size of the fibers, the lungs cannot expel them. These fibers are also sharp and penetrate internal tissues.

Health problems attributed to asbestos include:

1. Asbestosis - A lung disease first found in textile workers, asbestosis is a scarring of the lung tissue resulting from the production of growth factors that stimulate fibroblasts (the scar-producing lung cells) to proliferate and synthesize the scar tissue in response to injury by the inhaled fibers. The scarring may eventually become so severe that the lungs can no longer function. The latency period (meaning the time it takes for the disease to develop) is often 10–20 years.
2. Mesothelioma - A cancer of the mesothelial lining of the lungs and the chest cavity, the peritoneum (abdominal cavity) or the pericardium (a sac surrounding the heart). Unlike lung cancer, mesothelioma has no association with smoking. The only established causal factor is exposure to asbestos or similar fibers. The latency period for mesothelioma may be 20–50 years. The prognosis for mesothelioma is grim, with most patients dying within 12 months of diagnosis.
3. Cancer - Cancer of the lung, gastrointestinal tract, kidney and larynx have been linked to asbestos. The latency period for cancer is often 15–30 years.
4. Diffuse pleural thickening

Considerable international controversy exists regarding the perceived rights and wrongs associated with litigation on compensation claims related to asbestos exposure and alleged subsequent medical consequences. Some measure of the vast range of views expressed in legal and political circles can perhaps be exemplified by the two quotes below, the first from Prof. Lester Brickman, an American legal ethicist writing in the Pepperdine Law Review, and second, Michael Wills, a British Member of Parliament, speaking in the House of Commons on July 13. 2006:

"A review of the scholarly literature indicates a substantial degree of indifference to the causes of this civil justice system failure. Many of the published articles on asbestos litigation focus on transactional costs and ways in which the flow of money from defendants to plaintiffs and their lawyers can be expeditiously and efficiently prioritized and routed. The failure to acknowledge, let alone analyze, the overriding reality of specious claiming and meritless claims demonstrates a disconnect between the scholarship and the reality of the litigation that is nearly as wide as the disconnect between rates of disease claiming and actual disease manifestation".

"Many of those who I see in my surgeries have worked in a number of workplaces and they could have been exposed to asbestos in each of them, but medical science is such that no one can identify which of them it is. As a result, there has been a long and complex history of legal discussion on how to apportion liability. The lawyers and the judiciary have wrestled, rightly and valiantly, with complex and difficult law, but it has created despair for the families whom we represent. Many of my constituents' families have been riven by the consequences of litigation in trying to get some compensation for a disease that has been contracted through no fault of theirs. That is cruel and unacceptable."

== Regulation ==
=== Complete bans on asbestos ===
Worldwide, 68 countries and territories (including those in the European Union) have banned the use of asbestos. Exemptions for minor uses are permitted in some countries listed; however, all countries listed must have banned the use of all types of asbestos.

Country	Ban Date
Algeria	2009
Argentina	2003
Australia	December 31, 2003
Austria	2004
Bahrain	1996
Belgium	1998
Brazil	November 29, 2017
Brunei	1996
Bulgaria	2005
Canada	December 31, 2018
Chile	2001
Colombia	January 1, 2021
Croatia	2006
Cyprus	2005
Czech Republic	1999
Denmark	1986
Djibouti	1999
Egypt	2005
Estonia	2005
Finland	January 1, 1994
France	1997
Gabon	2012
Germany	1993
Gibraltar	2007
Greece	2005
Honduras	
Hong Kong	April 4, 2014
Hungary	2005
Iceland	1983
Iraq	2016
Iran	
Ireland	2000
Israel	2011
Italy	1992
Japan	March 2012
Jordan	2006
South Korea	January 2009
Kuwait	2001
Latvia	2005
Liechtenstein	1990
Lithuania	2005
Luxembourg	2001
Malta	2005
Mauritius	
Moldova	2024
Monaco	2005
Mozambique	2010
Netherlands	1994
New Caledonia	2007
New Zealand	2015
North Macedonia	2014
Norway	1985
Oman	2017
Poland	1997
Portugal	2005
Qatar	2010
Romania	2007
Saudi Arabia	1998
Serbia	2015
Seychelles	2006
Slovakia	2001
Slovenia	2005
South Africa	2008
Spain	2002
Sweden	1982
Switzerland	1990
Taiwan	2018
Turkey	2010
Ukraine	September 6, 2022
United Kingdom	2000
Uruguay	2004

=== International law ===
Asbestos is listed as a category of controlled waste under Annex I of the Basel Convention on the Control of Transboundary Movements of Hazardous Wastes and their Disposal [1992]. Specifically, any waste streams having asbestos (dust and fibers) as constituents are controlled (Item Y36). In general terms, Parties to the convention are required to prohibit and not permit the export of hazardous wastes to the Parties which have prohibited the import of such wastes via the notification procedure in Article 13 of the convention.

=== Australia ===
A nationwide ban on importing and using all forms asbestos took effect on 31 December 2003. Reflecting the ban, the National Occupational Health and Safety Commission (NOHSC) revised asbestos-related material to promote a consistent approach to controlling exposure to workplace asbestos and to introduce best-practice health and safety measures for asbestos management, control and removal. The ban does not cover asbestos materials or products already in use at the time the ban was implemented.

Although Australia has only a third of the UK's population, its asbestos disease fatalities approximate Britain's of more than 3,000 people per year.

Western Australia' center of blue asbestos mining was Wittenoom. The mine was run by CSR Limited (a company that had been the Colonial Sugar Refinery). The main manufacturer of asbestos products was James Hardie, which set up a minor fund for its workers, then transferred operations to the Netherlands where it would be out of reach of the workers when the fund expired.

=== Brazil ===
The São Paulo State law 12.684/07 prohibits the use of any product which utilizes asbestos. This legislation has been formally upheld by the Brazilian Supremo Tribunal Federal.

=== Canada ===
Since the 1980s, Canada has not permitted crocidolite asbestos to be used and has had limitations on certain uses of other types of asbestos, notably in some construction materials and textiles.

In late 2011, Canada's remaining two asbestos mines, both located in the Province of Quebec, halted operations. The following year, Quebec's government announced a halt to asbestos mining and the federal government announced that it would end its opposition to adding chrysotile asbestos to the list of hazardous substances under the international Rotterdam Convention.

In 2018, the Canadian federal government posted proposed regulations planned for implementation later that year, which would prohibit use, sale, import, and export of all forms of asbestos. Since 30 December 2018, the import, sale, and use of raw asbestos have been formally prohibited, and products containing asbestos are also banned except for certain specialized uses, such as in nuclear facilities.

=== France ===
France banned the use of asbestos in 1997, and the World Trade Organization (WTO) upheld France's right to the ban in 2000. In addition, France has called for a worldwide ban.

=== Hong Kong ===
The import, shipment, supply of, and use of all forms of asbestos is banned in Hong Kong under the Air Pollution Control Ordinance (Cap. 311).

Before the 1980s, use of the material was common in construction, manufacturing, and shipping. The government banned the use of most asbestos products in public areas in 1978. The Factories and Industrial Undertakings (Asbestos) Special Regulation (Cap. 59X), which came into force in 1986, and the subsequent Factories and Industrial Undertakings (Asbestos) Regulation (Cap. 59AD) implemented controls on the use of asbestos in the workplace and banned the use of amphibole asbestos completely.

The import of amosite or crocidolite to Hong Kong was banned in 1996 by the Air Pollution Control Ordinance (Cap. 311). On 4 April 2014, the Air Pollution Control (Amendment) Ordinance 2014 came into force, completely banning the import, transshipment, supply and installation of all forms of asbestos and asbestos-containing materials in Hong Kong by amending the existing Air Pollution Control Ordinance. Buildings built before the mid-1980s may continue the use of asbestos-containing materials.

=== India ===
The Vision Statement on Environment and Human Health of the Government of India states "Alternatives to asbestos may be used to the extent possible and use of asbestos may be phased out."

In Case No.693/30/97-98, National Human Rights Commission (NHRC) has clearly directed to "Replace all asbestos sheets roofing with roofing made up of some other material that would not be harmful to inmates."

The Secretary of the Post Graduate Institute of Medical Education & Research (PGIMER, Chandigarh also voiced its opinion "Asbestos is definitely a harmful material, it causes cancer and other related diseases." In their complete statement and recommendation to NHRC they have clearly expressed their concern: "White asbestos (chrysotile asbestos) is implicated in so many studies with the following diseases: Mesothelioma (cancer of pleura), Lung Cancer, Peritoneal Cancer, Asbestosis, and is also considered as a cause for Ovarian Cancer, Laryngeal Cancer, Other Cancererous Diseases are produced in the person involved in Asbestos Industry." It concludes its position by specifying, "Hence, Use of White Asbestos should be completely banned in India and the same may be replaced by some safer alternative material."

The Joint Secretary, Government of Uttarakhand in Case No.2951/30/0/2011, submitted to the NHRC that "There is no cure for Asbestos Diseases. Stopping all exposure to Asbestos is only essential."

The Union Ministry of Labour's concept paper declared, "The Government of India is considering the ban on use of chrysotile asbestos in India to protect the workers and the general population against primary and secondary exposure to Chrysotile form of Asbestos." The Concept paper further notes, "Asbestosis is yet another occupational disease of the Lungs which is on an increase under similar circumstances warranting concentrated efforts of all stake holders to evolve strategies to curb this menace".

The Indian Factory Act and Bureau of Indian Standard already have rules and regulations for safe usage of asbestos contaminated products such as:

- IS 11769 Part 1: Guidelines for Safe Usage of Asbestos Cement Products like Asbestos Cement Sheets and Asbestos Cement Blocks.
- IS 11769 Part 2: Guidelines for Safe Usage of Asbestos Friction Products like Asbestos Friction Sheets and Brake Liners
- IS 11769 Part 3: Guidelines for Safe Usage of Asbestos Sealing and Insulation Products like CAF Gaskets, Gland Ropes, Insulation, Rope Lagging, Millboard
- IS 12081: Pictorial Warning to be implemented on equipment containing Asbestos Contaminated Products.
- IS 11451: Safety and Health Requirements related to Occupational Exposure to Asbestos contaminated Products.
- IS 11768: Waste Disposal Procedure for Asbestos Containing Products.

However, there is no enforcement of the rules at ground level, hence asbestos usage is prevalent without following even the simplest basic safety rules.

The Centre for Pollution Control Board struggles to enforce their own guidelines for asbestos as hazardous waste and relies on industries and companies to volunteer themselves to follow Safety Regulations.

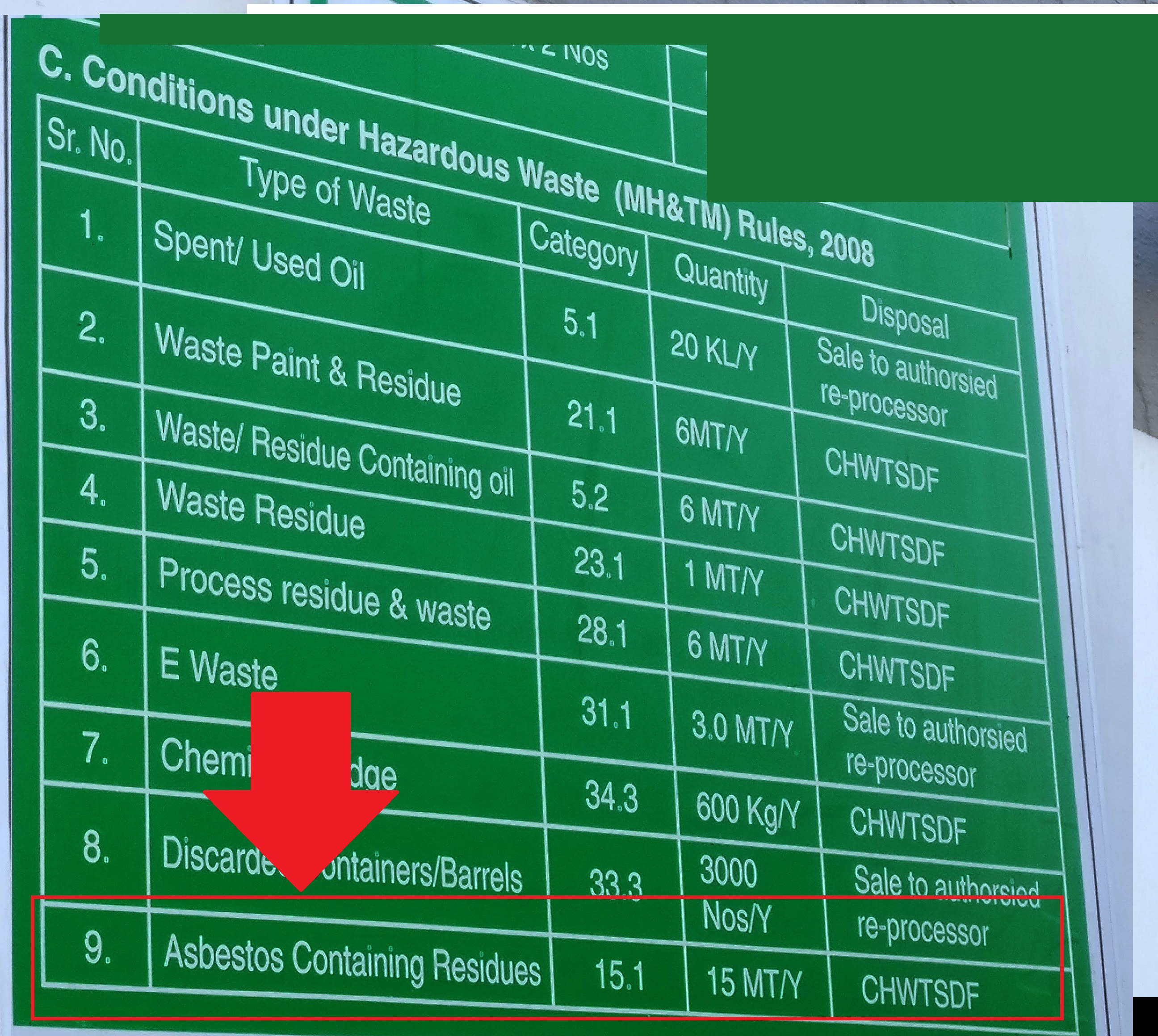
Factory displaying using asbestos and listing it under Hazardous as per CPCB guidelines

There continues to be a high usage of friable or dust based asbestos in compressed asbestos fiber (CAF) gaskets, ropes, cloth, gland packings, millboards, insulation and brake liners in factories and industries within India as well as inadvertently exported by equipment manufacturers without adequate knowledge and information to the other countries.

On 21 January 2011, the Supreme Court of India reiterated the guidelines laid down by it in the 1995 judgement regarding asbestos.

In spite of the health hazards, asbestos is widely used in India without any restriction. Activists in India and abroad have tried to persuade the governments of Canada and Quebec to stop asbestos mining in Quebec and exporting to India. The Canadian government has repeatedly blocked asbestos being listed as a hazardous chemical by the UN even though it spends massive amounts of money to remove it from Canadian homes and offices. While India recognizes it as a hazardous substance and has banned asbestos mining and its waste trade, it keeps its price low through patronage.

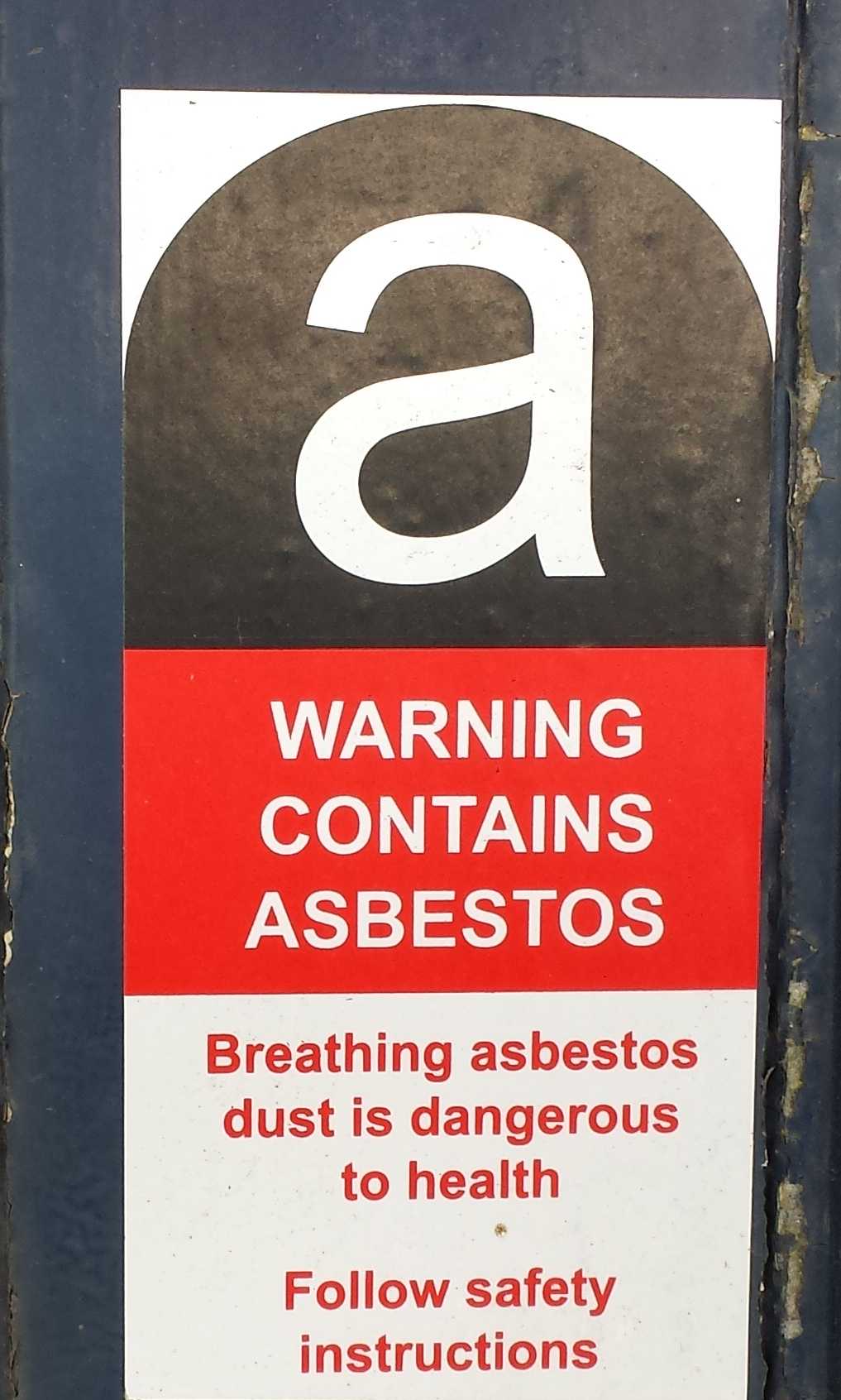
Example of an asbestos warning label that must be put on boilers, flanges, pipes, pumps, and furnaces using asbestos-based products such as CAF gaskets, gland packings, insulation, millboard, etc.

On 15 August 2016, in the strongest statement till date, the Anil Madhav Dave, Union Minister of Environment, Forest & Climate Change categorically specified "Since the use of asbestos is affecting human health, its usage should gradually be minimised and ended. As far as I know, its use is declining, but it must end"

The Ban Asbestos Network of India (BANI) has been working towards an asbestos free India to safeguard the health of the present and future generations amidst the misinformation campaign of the White Chrysotile Industry.

On 5 May 2017, India opposed listing of asbestos under the Prior Informed Consent (PIC) list of hazardous substances during the 2017 United Nations Rotterdam Convention. As such, India is the second democracy (after Russia) to have such a stance, globally. Besides India, Russia, Kazakhstan, Kyrgyzstan, Syria, and Zimbabwe also opposed the listing. While, all the other countries opposing are producers of asbestos; India (where mining is banned) is the sole (and largest) consumer and importer of asbestos still opposing its inclusion on the PIC List.

The National Asbestos Profile of India made in cooperation by Peoples Training and Research Centre, Vadodara, Occupational & Environmental Health Network of India, New Delhi and Asia Monitor Resource Centre, Hong Kong is the first such attempt and resource for identifying total asbestos usage in India. This extensive profile documents the manufacturers, consumers, health and disease statistics of asbestos use in India.

=== Italy ===
Italy fully banned the use of asbestos in 1992 with law 257/92 art. 1 and set up a comprehensive plan for asbestos decontamination in industry and housing.

=== Japan ===
Japan did not fully ban asbestos until 2004. Its government has been held responsible for related diseases.

=== Philippines ===
The Philippines has a limited ban on asbestos. While the use of amphibole asbestos is banned as early as 2000 through Administrative Order for the Chemical Control Order of Asbestos issued by the Department of Environment and Natural Resources, chrysotile asbestos is allowed for use in specific high density products.

=== Poland ===
Poland fully banned asbestos in 1997. Since then the import of asbestos and products containing it, production of anything containing asbestos and circulation of asbestos and products which have it is prohibited.

=== South Africa ===
Asbestos was banned in South Africa in 2008. Prior to this, the country was one of the global leaders in asbestos production, and consequently had one of the highest rates of mesothelioma. Regulations to ban asbestos in South Africa occurred in March 2008 under the leadership of Environmental Affairs and Tourism Minister Marthinus van Schalkwyk. The first draft regulations were announced in November 2005 for public comment and again in September 2007. The regulations prohibited the use, processing, manufacturing, and import and export of any asbestos or asbestos-containing materials (ACMs). A grace period of 120 days was allowed to give people or traders currently dealing in asbestos or ACMs to clear their stock. Exemptions would be granted under strict control. The regulations did not prohibit the continued use of asbestos-containing materials that were already in place such as asbestos-cement roof sheets or ceilings, the department was satisfied that there was "no undue risk" and they would be replaced in due time. Penalties for the continued use of asbestos include a fine which would not exceed R100 000 and/or imprisonment of less than ten years. Prior to the regulations' implementation, asbestos had been in the process of being phased out from as early as 2003. Requests from Zimbabwe and Canada to be excepted from the prohibition were denied. South Africa also terminated all import of asbestos or ACMs from Zimbabwe. South Africa would allow products to pass through its borders while in transit under strict conditions and if registered with the department of Environmental Affairs and Tourism. Everite, a building company, supported the government's ban on imports from Zimbabwe It became an offence to acquire, process, package or repackage, manufacture or distribute these products from after July 28, 2008. Kgalagadi Relief Trust (KRT) chair Brian Gibson stated that asbestos may still be imported into South Africa for research or analysis. Asbestos may also be imported into the country for disposal from Southern African Development Community (SADC) countries that were unable to dispose of the waste themselves.

=== South Korea ===
In May 1997, the manufacture and use of crocidolite and amosite, commonly known as blue and brown asbestos, were fully banned in South Korea. In January 2009, a full-fledged ban on all types of asbestos occurred when the government banned the manufacture, import, sale, storage, transport or use of asbestos or any substance containing more than 0.1% of asbestos. In 2011, South Korea became the world's sixth country to enact an asbestos harm aid act, which entitles any Korean citizen to free lifetime medical care as well as monthly income from the government if they are diagnosed with an asbestos-related disease.

=== New Zealand ===
In 1984, the import of raw amphibole (blue and brown) asbestos into New Zealand was banned. In 2002, the import of chrysotile (white) asbestos was banned.

=== United Kingdom ===
The British Government's Health and Safety Executive (HSE) has promoted rigorous controls on asbestos handling, based on reports linking exposure to asbestos dust or fibres with thousands of annual deaths from mesothelioma and asbestos-related lung cancer.

- "Over 5,000 asbestos-related disease deaths per year currently (2022)"
- The TUC (UK) cited a figure of 5,000 deaths per year in 2004.

The HSE does not assume that there is any minimum threshold for exposure to asbestos below which a person is at zero risk of developing mesothelioma, since they consider that it cannot currently be quantified for practical purposes; they cite evidence from epidemiological studies of asbestos-exposed groups to argue that even if there is any such threshold for mesothelioma, it must be at a very low level. Previously it was possible to claim compensation for pleural plaques caused by negligent exposure to asbestos, on the grounds that although it is in itself asymptomatic, it is linked to development of diffuse pleural thickening, which causes lung impairment. It has been highly contentious, however, as to the probability of pleural plaques developing into pleural thickening or other asbestos-related illnesses. On October 17, 2007, this point was clarified by the Law Lords' ruling that workers who have pleural plaques as a result of asbestos exposure will no longer be able to seek compensation as it does not in itself constitute a disease. This ruling was, however, superseded, so far as sufferers of pleural plaques in Scotland are concerned, by the passing of the Damages (Asbestos-related Conditions)(Scotland) Act 2009, which provides that in Scots law pleural plaques are to be considered an actionable type of personal injury.

==== Control of Asbestos Regulations ====
The Control of Asbestos Regulations 2006 (SI 2006/2739) were introduced in the UK in November 2006 and were an amalgamation of three previous sets of legislation (Asbestos Prohibition, Asbestos Licensing and the Control of Asbestos at Work Regulations) aimed at minimising the use and disturbance of asbestos containing materials within British workplaces. Essentially this legislation bans the import and use of most asbestos products and sets out guidelines on how best to manage those currently in situ.

Control of Asbestos Regulations 2012
- Statutory Instrument
- Parliament of the United Kingdom
- Citation: SI 2012/632

Dates
- Made: 27 February 2012
- Laid before Parliament: 5 March 2012
- Commencement: 6 April 2012
Other legislation
Repeals/revokes	Control of Asbestos Regulations 2006
Made under	Health and Safety at Work etc. Act 1974; European Communities Act 1972
Transposes	Council Directives 2009/148/EC, 90/394/EEC, 98/24/EC

Text of statute as originally enacted

The Control of Asbestos Regulations 2006 were revoked and replaced by the Control of Asbestos Regulations 2012 (SI 2012/632) which came into force on 6 April 2012. This was to take account of the European Commission's view that the UK had not fully implemented the EU Directive on exposure to asbestos (Directive 2009/148/EC). These changes were relatively minor and included additional requirements for non-licensed asbestos work. These changes mean that some non-licensed asbestos work now requires notification, and has additional requirements for managing this work (e.g. record keeping and health surveillance).

Dutyholders of all non-domestic properties within the UK must establish an asbestos register and a management plan. The definition of "non-domestic" is "a property or structure (commercial, domestic or residential) where work is carried out" and the obligation of a "dutyholder" is to ensure that people are not exposed to any asbestos-based materials during the course of their work. The Asbestos Register states the presence or non-presence of asbestos related to the inside and outside of the structure. The exception is where the property age (post-1999 when chrysotile asbestos was banned) would indicate that such products will not have been used during the construction of the building.

Regulation 4 prescribes that each non-domestic building's "dutyholder", as defined in law, has a duty to manage the risk from asbestos and mandates that "a suitable and sufficient assessment is carried out". Risk assessment involves a combination of factors relating to the type and condition of the asbestos-containing materials and the likelihood of disturbance and exposure. Human exposure potential depends on the number of occupants in a building and the frequency and duration of use, and the nature of any disturbance: for example, intrusive maintenance activity within the building increases the risk of exposure – removing a number of asbestos-containing ceiling tiles to undertake works above the ceiling level would raise greater risks than changing a light bulb. Buildings may be ranked according to whether disturbance activity is undertaken:

- rare disturbance activity, e.g. a little-used store room
- low disturbance activity, e.g. office work
- periodic disturbance activity, e.g. industrial use or vehicular movement
- high disturbance activity, e.g. a fire door containing asbestos-insulating boards which is in constant use

The HSE uses a priority scoring tool which combines assessment of the material containing asbestos and the disturbance risk.

The outcome of the risk assessment will identify priorities for management of the locations and materials containing asbestos, for example areas which require urgent attention, materials which are not suited to any form of containment may need to be removed or encased, minor repairs may be needed, or labelling and provision of information may be sufficient to ensure that significant health risks can be avoided, e.g. for a little-used store room it may be sufficient to keep the door locked and attach a warning notice to the door.

The HSE points out that "Regulation 4 is a duty to manage, not [just] a duty to survey".

The removal of high-risk asbestos products from non-domestic properties is tightly controlled by the HSE and high-risk products such as thermal insulation must be removed under controlled conditions by licensed contractors. Further guidance on which products this applies to can be found on the HSE website along with a list of licensees.

The current regulations show that it is a legal requirement that all who may come across asbestos in their day-to-day work have been provided with the relevant asbestos training.

==== Bans ====
The manufacture and import of Blue and Brown Asbestos were banned in the United Kingdom in 1985 by The asbestos (Prohibitions) Regulations 1985. The use of White Asbestos was banned in England, Scotland and Wales in 1999 by The Asbestos (Prohibitions) (Amendment) Regulations 1999. Asbestos was banned in Northern Ireland in 2000 by the Asbestos (Prohibitions) (Amendment) Regulations (Northern Ireland) 2000.

=== United States ===
The Environmental Protection Agency (EPA) has no general ban on the use of asbestos. However, asbestos was one of the first hazardous air pollutants regulated under Section 112 of the Clean Air Act of 1970, and many applications have been forbidden by the Toxic Substances Control Act (TSCA). The United States has extensive laws regulating the use of asbestos at the federal, state, and local level.

== Litigation ==
One of the major issues relating to asbestos in civil procedure is the latency of asbestos-related diseases. Most countries have limitation periods to bar actions that are taken long after the cause of action has lapsed. For example, in Malaysia the time period to file a tort action is six years from the time the tort occurred. Due to several asbestos-related actions, countries such as Australia have amended their laws relating to limitations to accumulate starting from time of discovery rather than time when the cause of action accrued.

The first employee claims for injury from exposure to asbestos in the workplace were made in 1927, and the first lawsuit against an asbestos manufacturer was filed in 1929. Since then, many lawsuits have been filed. As a result of the litigation, manufacturers sold off subsidiaries, diversified, produced asbestos substitutes, and started asbestos removal businesses.

=== Brazil ===
In June 2008, the Brazilian Supreme Federal Court (STF) voted to maintain the law (12.684/07) which prohibits the use of any product which utilizes asbestos in São Paulo State. It was expected then the decision would be extended to include the whole country.

In August 2017, in what is known in Brazil as a "direct action for the declaration of unconstitutionality", an instrument to declare the unconstitutionality of law or federal norms, with respect to the current Constitution (the equivalent in the U.S. as a "judicial review"), the constitutionality of the prohibitive law of São Paulo was questioned. The Supreme Federal Court considered it constitutional and even incidentally declared the unconstitutionality of Art. 2 of Federal Law nº 9.055/95, that authorized the use of chrysotile asbestos in a controlled manner.

On November 29, 2017, the Supreme Federal Court prohibited the extraction, industrialization and commercialization of asbestos throughout the country. Despite this, asbestos has continued to be extracted in Goiás under claims that the state's asbestos is "the only one recognized worldwide as not causing any ill effects to the population". As of January 2025, the Supreme Federal Court has yet to rule on the constitutionality of the state law that allows for the extraction.

=== South Africa ===
The Lubbe v Cape Plc case [2000] UKHL 41 is a conflict of laws case, which is also significant for the question of "lifting the corporate veil" in relation to tort victims. Mrs Lubbe was exposed to asbestos while working for a South African subsidiary company of the UK parent company, Cape plc.

The Richard Meeran-run Cape Plc case was settled in 2003.

The Richard Spoor-run Gencor case was settled in 2003.

400 Swaziland ARD victims from the Havelock mine

The Havelock chrysotile mine cases were suspended in 2003 because Turner and Newall, the company that owned the mine, had filed for bankruptcy in 2001.

Swiss Eternit Group

This was a voluntary agreement which was reached in 2006. The agreement enabled ex-miners of the Kuruman and Danielskuil Cape Blue Asbestos (KCBA and DCBA) mines in the Northern Cape province to apply under similar conditions as the open settlement of the ART. The Kgalagadi Relief Trust (KRT) was thus created. The terms of the trust are not clarified however in practice R136 million was paid over for compensation purposes, for payouts until 2026. The trustees of the KRT requested the ART to administer the KRT settlement as the two trusts were very similarly structured.

Seventy-five percent of the claimants in the Cape Plc case came from Limpopo province and the remaining twenty-five percent from the Prieska Koegas area in the Northern Cape province. The majority of the claimants in the ART settlement (around 78%) were exposed in the Kuruman area in the Northern Cape province, with the balance exposed at Penge in Limpopo province and Msauli in Mpumalanga province, which were equally proportioned.

Statistically, mesothelioma and asbestos related lung cancer sufferers receiving the highest payments of R71,500 each. Due to Gencor's significant contribution settlements, it was prohibited for those who had received compensation under the Cape agreement to later be paid by the ART, even if the worker had worked on the Kuruman or Penge mines when under Gencor control.

==== Relief trusts ====
In 2006, Cape plc started a trust to compensate those who have suffered from asbestos related diseases as a result of Cape's historical activities. To date, this Trust has paid out over £30m to those who have become sick or to their dependents. The Scheme of Arrangement was approved by the High Court and is separately funded. Its funds being administered by two independent trustees.

Asbestos Relief Trust (ART) is regarded as a model of efficient occupational disease compensation in South Africa. Gencor was a major contributor to the Richard Meeran-run Cape Plc case and the Richard Spoor-run Gencor case. Glencor provided 29% of the R138 million that went to the Cape Plc's set of claimants, and 96% of the R381 million that formed the ART. An additional sum of R35 million went to environmental rehabilitation, and about R20 million was added to the ART to contribute to supplementary and additional payments. After some time and publicity claims against The Cape Plc list had grown from 2 000 in January 1999 and to 7 500 in August 2001. The ART settlement was open, and made provision for compensation to any person who met the compensation criteria set out in the Trust deed, until the year 2028. Many companies agreed to compensate the workers which were exposed to asbestos in addition to the compensation payable under the Occupational Diseases in Mines and Works Act (ODMWA) The settlement included environmentally expose victims of ARDS. This settlement model was achieved by personal communication, Georgina Jephson, attorney at Richard Spoor Inc. Attorneys.

The Trust provides compensation for people in these four categories related to Acute respiratory distress syndrome (ARD) namely:

- (ARD1)- asbestosis / pleural thickening with mild to moderate
- (ARD2) -lung function impairment or with severe lung function impairment
- (ARD3) -asbestos-related lung cancer
- (ARD4) -mesothelioma

A model by the ART estimated that about 16 800 individuals would submit claims to the Trust, of which approximately 5 036 (30%) would be successful. This was subsequently revised to 5 162. Of these, 219 (4.2%) would be environmental claimants, 150 (2.9%) would have lung cancer and 556 (10.8%) would have mesothelioma; the balance would have asbestosis and/or pleural thickening. No definitive figures were provided for the expected ARD1/ ARD2 ratio. The amounts payable for compensation vary, but the average amount of compensation since 2003 has been about R40 000, R80 000, R170 000 and R350 000 for each of the categories ARD 1-4 described above. These amounts are paid over and above any compensation that the claimants might receive under the ODMWA. In order for a case to be compensable, a victim needs to show that he/she was both exposed to asbestos from one of the operations run by the funders of the ART, and has a compensable disease.

==== Health ====
A lack of facilities for terminally ill mesothelioma sufferers results in a larger burden of service, according to Sister Phemelo Magabanyane, a palliative care nurse who has cared for over 100 mesothelioma and lung cancer sufferers in the greater Kuruman district in the Northern Cape. Mesothelioma is a life-threatening cancer of the pleura or peritoneum which can be diagnosed up to 40 years after exposure to asbestos.

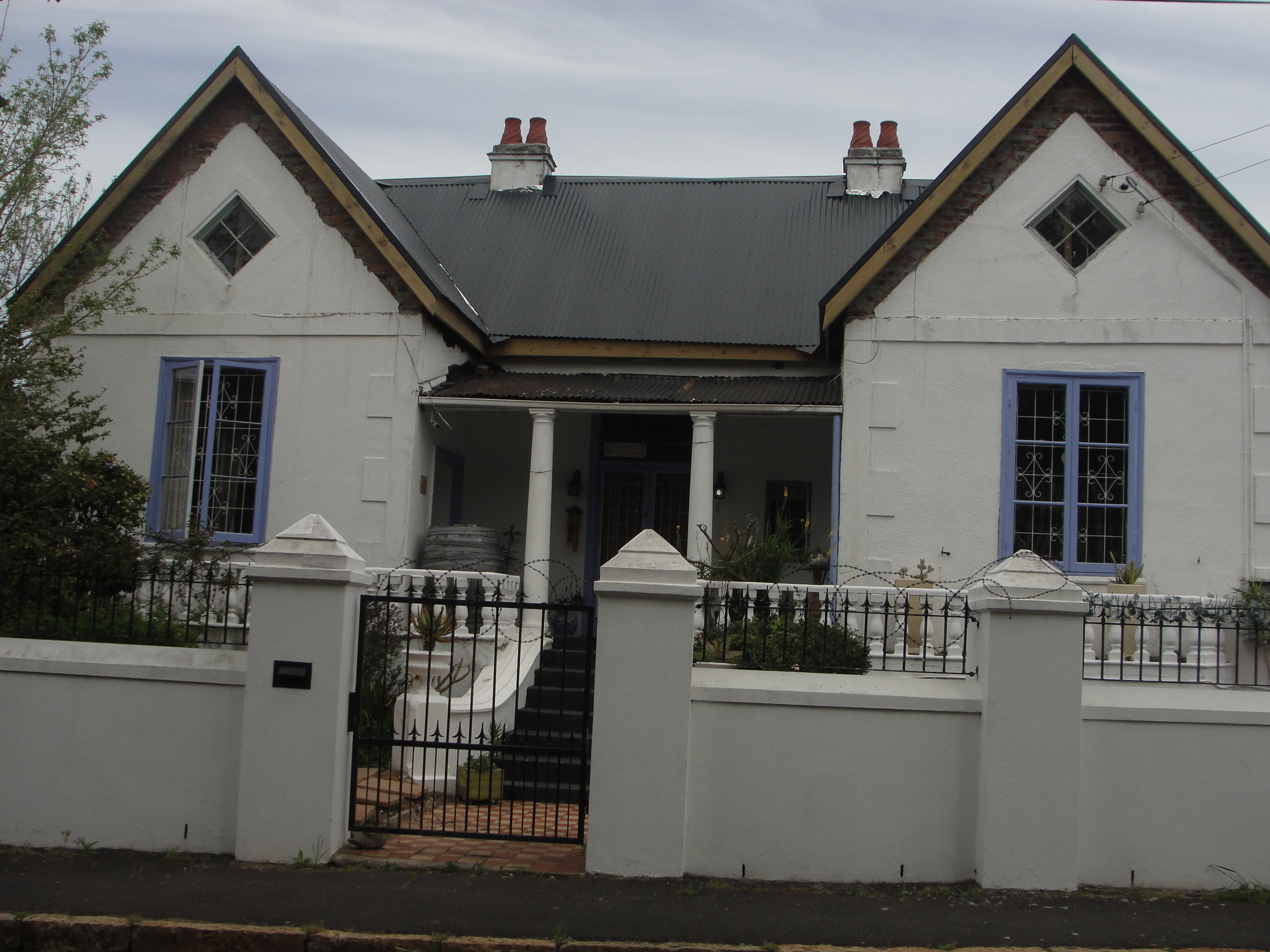
A Victorianised house in Wynberg, Cape Town with an asbestos cement roof in 2014

==== The aftermath ====
South Africa has the highest prevalence of mesothelioma in the world. Richard Spoor, a lawyer who represented the claimants against Gencor says: "The environmental scale of the disaster we are seeing unfold in the Northern Cape is on a level with the nuclear disaster at Chernobyl, in terms of impact, spread and longevity," he also says that children are particularly vulnerable to mesothelioma. Since September 2016, five of the 1 600 claimants he represents in the Northern Cape have died. Internationally renowned photographer David Goldblatt started photographing victims after a friend died of mesothelioma despite never being in close proximity to a mine. It has been reported that she picked up the disease from rubbing a blue asbestos rock ornament that she kept in her home.

=== United Kingdom ===
The Guardian reported a test-case ruling in 2005, that allowed thousands of workers to be compensated for pleural plaques. Diffuse or localised fibrosis of the pleura, or pleural plaques, is less serious than asbestosis or mesothelioma, but is also considered a disease closely linked to the inhalation of asbestos. However, insurers claimed the plaques are "simply a marker for asbestos exposure rather than an injury." Mr Justice Holland rejected the insurers' arguments, and counsel for workers hailed the decision as a "victory that puts people before profits." However this decision was reversed by the Court of Appeal. On 17 October 2007, the House of Lords confirmed the Court of Appeal's decision. Pleural plaques no longer constitute actionable injury in England, Wales and Northern Ireland. The Scottish government introduced legislation in 2009 to preserve the status of pleural plaques as an actionable injury in Scotland and there are proposals to introduce similar legislation in Northern Ireland.

Insurance companies allege that asbestos litigation has taken too heavy a toll on insurance and industry. A 2002 article in the British The Daily Telegraph's associate quoted Equitas, the reinsurance vehicle which assumed Lloyd's of London's liabilities, which argued that asbestos claims were the "greatest single threat" to Lloyd's of London's existence. Of note is that Lloyd's of London had been sued for fraud by its investors, who claimed Lloyd's misrepresented pending losses from asbestos claims.

In May 2006, the House of Lords ruled that compensation for asbestos injuries should be reduced where responsibility could not be attached to a single employer. Critics, including trade unions, asbestos groups and Jim Wallace, former justice minister, condemned the ruling. They said it overturned the traditional Scottish law to such cases, and was a breach of natural justice. As a result of this outcry, the ruling has been overturned by section three of the Compensation Act 2006.

In February 2010 a court ruling set a new precedent for asbestosis claims. The case, in which widow Della Sabin attempted to claim compensation following her husband's death from asbestosis, hinged on the issue of how many asbestos fibers must be present in the lungs for a claim to be valid. A research team based at Llandough Hospital initially reported that the minimum amount of fibers that needed to be present for a claim to be valid was 20 million (only 7 million were found in the sample taken from Mrs Sabin's husband Leslie). However, a subsequent US study suggested that, due to the fact that Leslie had lived for more than forty years after his exposure, a large number of fibers would have cleared from his body naturally; had he died twenty years earlier the asbestos count in his lungs would have been about 35 million fibers per gram. The judge preferred this evidence, and ruled in favor of Mrs Sabin.

The main appellate cases involving asbestos in the UK courts:

- Fairchild v Glenhaven Funeral Services Ltd
- Barker v Corus (UK) plc
- Johnston v NEI International Combustion Ltd [2007] UKHL 39

=== United States ===
==== Civil lawsuits ====
Litigation related to asbestos injuries and property damages has been claimed to be the longest-running mass tort in U.S. history, involving more than 8,000 defendants and 700,000 claimants. Since asbestos-related disease has been identified by the medical profession in the late 1920s, workers' compensation cases were filed and resolved in secrecy, with a flood of litigation starting in the United States in the 1970s, and culminating in the 1980s and 1990s. Current trends indicate that the rate at which people are diagnosed with asbsestos-related disease will likely increase through the next decade. Analysts have estimated that the total costs of asbestos litigation in the USA alone will eventually reach $200 to $275 billion. The amounts and method of allocating compensation have been the source of many court cases, and government attempts at resolution of existing and future cases. A multi-district litigation (MDL) complex filing has remained pending in the Eastern District of Pennsylvania for over 20 years. As many of the scarring-related injury cases have been resolved, asbestos litigation continues to be hard-fought among the litigants, mainly in individually brought cases for terminal cases of asbestosis, mesothelioma, and other cancers.

In June 1982, a retired boilermaker, James Cavett, won an award of $2.3 million compensatory and $1.5 million in punitive damages against Johns-Manville. The Manville Corporation, formerly the Johns-Manville Corporation, filed for reorganization and protection under the United States Bankruptcy Code in August 1982. At the time, it was the largest company ever to file bankruptcy, and was one of the richest. Manville was then 181st on the Fortune 500, but was the defendant of 16,500 lawsuits related to the health effects of asbestos. The company was described by Ron Motley, a South Carolina attorney, as "the greatest corporate mass murderer in history." Court documents show that the corporation had a long history of hiding evidence of the ill effects of asbestos from its workers and the public.

By the early 1990s, "more than half of the 25 largest asbestos manufacturers in the US, including Amatex, Carey-Canada, Celotex, Eagle-Picher, Forty-Eight Insulations, Manville Corporation, National Gypsum, Standard Insulation, Unarco, and UNR Industries had declared bankruptcy. Filing for bankruptcy protects a company from its creditors."

Asbestos-related cases increased on the U.S. Supreme Court docket after 1980 and the court has dealt with several asbestos-related cases since 1986. Two large class action settlements, designed to limit liability, came before the court in 1997 and 1999. Both settlements were ultimately rejected by the court because they would exclude future claimants, or those who later developed asbestos-related illnesses. These rulings addressed the 20-50 year latency period of serious asbestos-related illnesses.

In 1988, the United States Environmental Protection Agency (USEPA) issued regulations requiring certain U.S. companies to report the asbestos used in their products.

Several legislative remedies have been considered by the U.S. Congress but each time rejected for a variety of reasons. In 2005, Congress considered but did not pass legislation entitled the "Fairness in Asbestos Injury Resolution Act of 2005". The act would have established a $140 billion trust fund in lieu of litigation, but as it would have proactively taken funds held in reserve by bankruptcy trusts, manufacturers and insurance companies, it was not widely supported either by victims or corporations.

On April 26, 2005, Dr. Philip J. Landrigan, professor and chair of the Department of Community and Preventive Medicine at Mount Sinai Medical Center in New York City, testified before the US Senate Committee on the Judiciary against this proposed legislation. He testified that many of the bill's provisions were unsupported by medicine and would unfairly exclude a large number of people who had become ill or died from asbestos: "The approach to the diagnosis of disease caused by asbestos that is set forth in this bill is not consistent with the diagnostic criteria established by the American Thoracic Society. If the bill is to deliver on its promise of fairness, these criteria will need to be revised." Also opposing the bill were the American Public Health Association and the Asbestos Workers' Union.

On June 14, 2006, the Senate Judiciary Committee approved an amendment to the act which would have allowed victims of mesothelioma $1.1M within 30 days of their claim's approval. This version would have also expanded eligible claimants to people exposed to asbestos from the September 11 attacks on the World Trade Center, and to construction debris in hurricanes Katrina and Rita. Ultimately, the bill's reliance on funding from private entities large and small, as well as debate over a sunset provision and the impact on the U.S. budgetary process caused the bill to fail to leave committee.

Since the bankruptcy filing of Johns-Manville in 1984, many U.S. and U.K. asbestos manufacturers have escaped litigation by filing bankruptcy. Once in bankruptcy, these companies typically are required to fund special "bankruptcy trusts" that pay pennies on the dollar to injured parties. However, these trusts do permit larger numbers of claimants to receive some kind of compensation, even if greatly reduced from potential recoveries in the tort system.

Since 2002, asbestos lawsuits in the U.S. have included the following as defendants:

1. Manufacturers of machinery that are alleged to have required asbestos-containing parts to function properly;
2. Owners of premises at which asbestos-containing products were installed (which includes virtually anyone who owned a building prior to 1980);
3. Banks that financed ships or buildings where asbestos was installed (on the grounds that no rational lender would take a security interest in an asset without studying the risks involved);
4. Retailers of asbestos-containing products (including hardware, home improvement and automotive parts stores);
5. Corporations that allegedly conspired with asbestos manufacturers to deliberately conceal the dangers of asbestos (e.g., MetLife, a well-known insurance company which worked with Johns-Manville); and
6. Manufacturers of tools which were used to cut or shape asbestos-containing parts.

Defendants in the first category have contested liability on the grounds that nearly all of them either did not ship asbestos-containing parts with their products at all (that is, asbestos was installed only by end users) or did not sell replacement parts for their own products (in cases where the plaintiff was allegedly exposed well after any factory-original asbestos-containing parts would have been replaced), and either way cannot be responsible for toxic third-party parts that they did not manufacture, distribute, or sell. In 2008, the Washington Supreme Court, the first to reach the issue, decided in favor of the defense. On January 12, 2012, the Supreme Court of California also decided in favor of the defense in O'Neil v. Crane Co. This is significant as a 2007 study found that California and Washington were the two most influential state supreme courts in the United States in the period from 1940 to 2005.

In a decision from January 2014, Gray v. Garlock Sealing Technologies had entered into bankruptcy proceedings, and discovery in the case uncovered evidence of fraud that led to a reduction in estimated future liability to a tenth of what was estimated by plaintiffs' lawyers.

Some defendants raise what is sometimes called the chrysotile-defense, under which manufacturers of some products containing only chrysotile fibers claim that these are not as harmful as amphibole-containing products. As 95% of the products used in the United States historically were mostly chrysotile, this claim is widely disputed by health officials and medical professionals. The World Health Organization recognizes that exposure to all types of asbestos fibers, including chrysotile, can cause cancer of the lung, larynx, and ovary, mesothelioma, and asbestosis.

==== Criminal prosecutions ====
===== Adamo Wrecking Company =====
On February 20, 1973, a federal grand jury in Detroit, Michigan, indicted Adamo Wrecking Company for violating provisions of the Clean Air Act by knowingly causing the emission of asbestos by failure to wet and remove friable asbestos materials from demolitions.

Adamo was one of a number of demolition contractors indicted throughout the country for the alleged violation of the Clean Air Act. The United States District Court for the Eastern District of Michigan dismissed the criminal indictment on the ground that it was not an "emission standard," but a "work practice standard," which under the terms of the statute, did not carry criminal liability.

The government appealed and the Sixth Circuit Court of Appeals reversed the decision of the trial court, stating that it erred in determining that it had jurisdiction to review the validity of the standard in a criminal proceeding. Adamo's attorneys appealed to the Supreme Court.

On January 10, 1978, the Supreme Court ruled in favor of Adamo when it held that the trial court did have jurisdiction to review the standard in a criminal proceeding and also agreed with the trial court that the requirements in the act were "not standards" but "procedures" and therefore the proceedings were properly dismissed.

===== W. R. Grace and Company =====
A federal grand jury indicted W. R. Grace and Company and seven top executives on February 5, 2005, for its operations of a vermiculite mine in Libby, Montana. The indictment accused Grace of wire fraud, knowing endangerment of residents by concealing air monitoring results, obstruction of justice by interfering with an Environmental Protection Agency (EPA) investigation, violation of the Clean Air Act, providing asbestos materials to schools and local residents, and conspiracy to release asbestos and cover up health problems from asbestos contamination. According to the Baltimore Sun the Department of Justice said 1,200 residents had developed asbestos-related diseases and some had died, and there could be many more injuries and deaths.

In 2001, the federal government sued W.R. Grace to recover its investigation and cleanup costs in Libby, Montana, under the Superfund law. That lawsuit was settled in 2008, with W.R. Grace agreeing to pay $250 million, subject to approval by the court overseeing W.R. Grace's bankruptcy.

On June 8, 2006, a federal judge dismissed the conspiracy charge of "knowing endangerment" because some of the defendant officials had left the company before the five-year statute of limitations had begun to run. The wire fraud charge was dropped by prosecutors in March.

===== Unsafe abatement =====
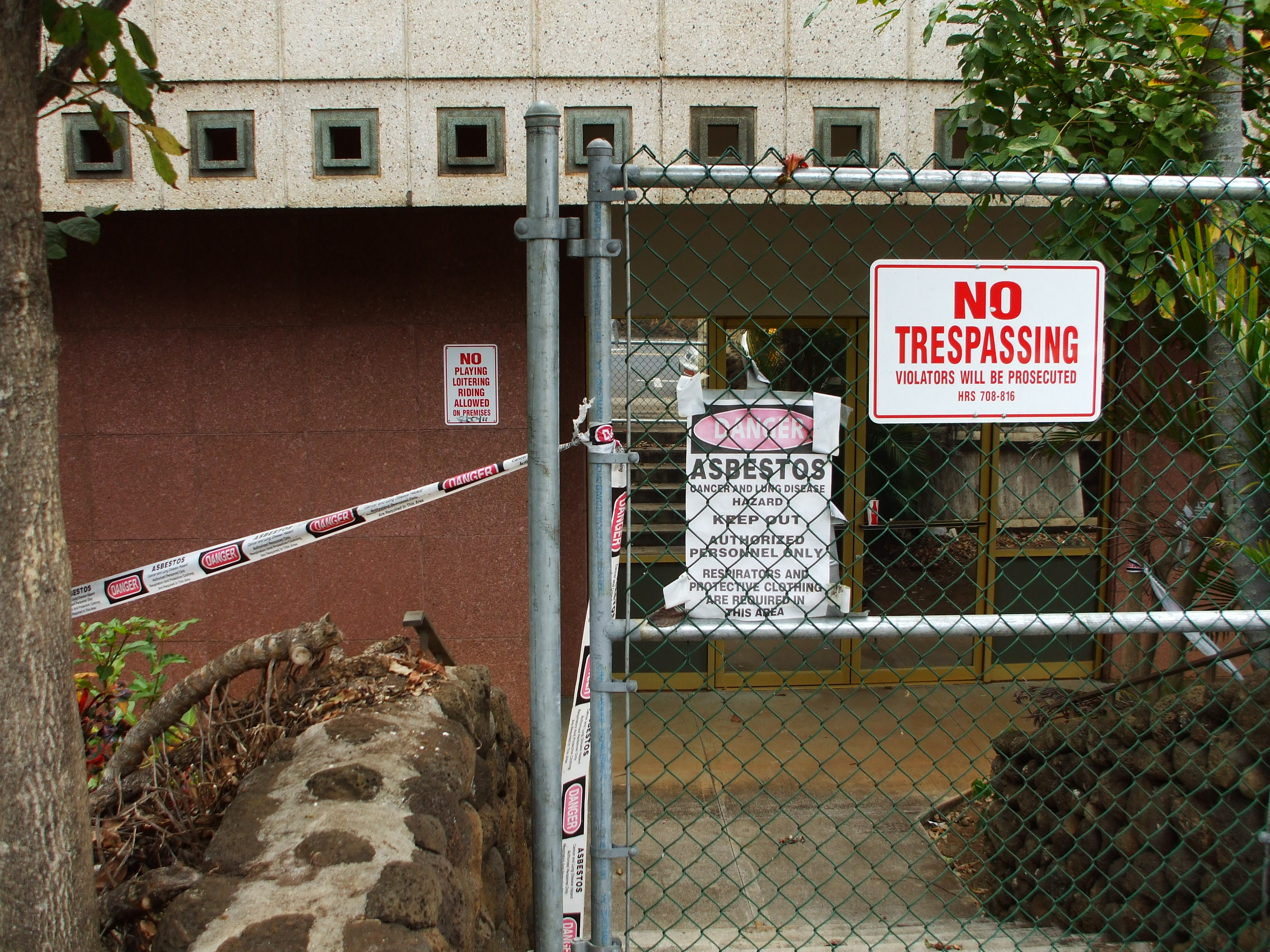
Old Wailuku Post Office sealed off for asbestos removal

Asbestos abatement (removal of asbestos) has become a thriving industry in the United States. Strict removal and disposal laws have been enacted to protect the public from airborne asbestos. The Clean Air Act requires that asbestos be wetted during removal and strictly contained, and that workers wear safety gear and masks. The federal government has prosecuted dozens of violations of the act and violations of Racketeer Influenced and Corrupt Organizations Act (RICO) related to the operations. Often these involve contractors who hire undocumented workers without proper training or protection to illegally remove asbestos.

On April 2, 1998, three men were indicted in a conspiracy to use homeless men for illegal asbestos removal from an aging Wisconsin manufacturing plant. Then-US Attorney General Janet Reno said, "Knowingly removing asbestos improperly is criminal. Exploiting the homeless to do this work is cruel."

On December 12, 2004, owners of New York asbestos abatement companies were sentenced to the longest federal jail sentences for environmental crimes in U.S. history, after they were convicted on 18 counts of conspiracy to violate the Clean Air Act and the Toxic Substances Control Act, and actual violations of the Clean Air Act and Racketeer-Influenced and Corrupt Organizations Act. The crimes involved a 10-year scheme to illegally remove asbestos. The RICO counts included obstruction of justice, money laundering, mail fraud and bid rigging, all related to the asbestos cleanup.

On January 11, 2006, San Diego Gas & Electric Co., two of its employees, and a contractor were indicted by a federal grand jury on charges that they violated safety standards while removing asbestos from pipes in Lemon Grove, California. The defendants were charged with five counts of conspiracy, violating asbestos work practice standards and making false statements.

== See also ==
- Adams v Cape Industries plc
- Donoghue v Stevenson
- Amchem Products Inc. v. British Columbia Worker's Compensation Board
- Asbestos
- Asbestos abatement
- Asbestos Convention, 1986
- Asbestos Mountains
- Asbestos strike
- Asbestosis
- Basel Convention
- Celotex Corp. v. Catrett
- Conflict of laws
- English tort law
- Environmental movement in South Africa
- Fibro
- Fireproofing
- James Hardie
- List of minerals
- Mesothelioma
- Mold and the law
- Occupational illness
- Pizarreño asbestos disaster
- Phase I Environmental Site Assessment
- UK company law
- Vermiculite
- Wittenoom, former asbestos mining town
