= Pizarreño asbestos disaster =

Ongoing health disaster in Chile

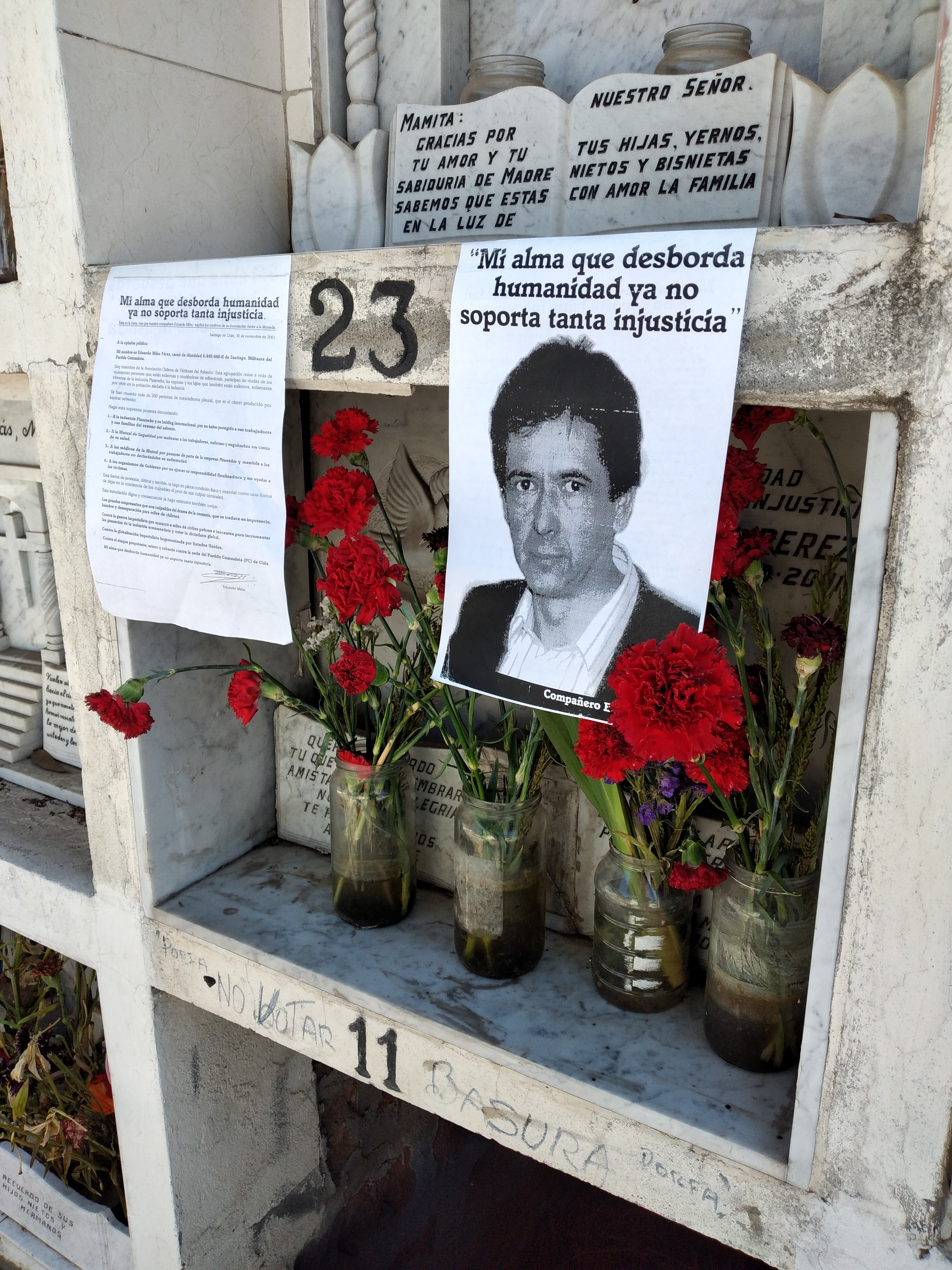
Tomb of Eduardo Miño who committed suicide in 2001 in protest to government neglect of Pizarreño's asbestos victims.

The Pizarreño asbestos disaster is an ongoing health disaster in Chile. Despite the company Pizarreño ceasing to use asbestos in 1998 and the prohibition of asbestos in 2001, its effects continue to be felt.

From 1935 to 1998 the company Pizarreño (Note: The board of directors of Pizarreño has over the years included influential figures such as Jorge Alessandri, Martín Costabal and Eugenio Heiremans. Heiremans in particular had a conflicting situation as he in the 1970s was President of Chilean Safety Association at the same time he was vice-president of Pizarreño.) contaminated its neighborhood and its workers' homes with asbestos while producing toxic building materials. The company's eponymous asbestos boards are the most notorious asbestos-rich material the company produced. In 1951 the Pizarreño moved its manufacture plant to Maipú near the road to Melipilla in the western periphery of Santiago. In Maipú, the company built Villa Pizarreño in the 1950s, a house complex next to the factory for its workers. Pizarreño's workers had to wash their clothes at home, contributing to the spread of asbestos and further exposing their relatives to the mineral. This situation lasted until 1989, when a system for washing clothes in the workplace was inaugurated.

Reportedly, during the military dictatorship of Chile a trade union leader who was to denounce the company in courts was kidnapped by the National Information Center only to be released six months later without charges.

René Cortázar has been accused of actively rejecting the enforcement of the Asbestos Convention while he was minister in 1992. Furthermore, Cortázar has been accused by Raúl Sohr of acting in tandem with Pizarreño in suppressing journalistic investigations into the asbestos issue while he was director of Televisión Nacional de Chile from 1995 to 2000. (Note: The asbestos-related accusations against Cortázar came to the spotlight again amidst his candidacy for Constitutional Convention in 2021. His rival Valentina Miranda said of him: "René Cortázar covered up the asbestos genocide [sic] and does not deserve to be a constituent". Cortázar's candidacy was ultimately unsuccessful despite being the one that received most donations.) In 1996 the minister of housing Edmundo Hermosilla continued to support the use of asbestos in housing reportedly claiming that regulation of asbestos would make housing projects for the poor more expensive and that this would be a "luxury" Chile could not afford. Hermosilla would also have been concerned about the possibility of mass media reporting on the issue would usher a "psychosis like in Europe".

As result of the disaster since 2001 various types of asbestos and uses of asbestos have been forbidden by law, in what is an effective ban on asbestos. (Note: In 2001 Canadian diplomats made an unsuccessful attempt to lobby Chilean government to ease the asbestos ban. This prompted Chilean trade unions to protest outside the embassy of Canada in Santiago. Earlier that year Prime minister of Canada Jean Chrétien made a phone call to President Ricardo Lagos aiming reverse the asbestos ban. The context of the Canadian interest in promoting asbestos is that Chile used to import about 20% of the asbestos used in the country from Canada.) The ban on asbestos, however, notoriously came after Pizarreño voluntarily stopped use it in its products in 1998.

== Notable victims ==
- Eduardo Miño. He committed suicide by self-immolation in November 2001 in protest of the neglect of asbestos victims like himself and others.
- Julieta Bernal Trigo. She died in May 2016 of lung cancer. She was exposed by her proximity to the Pizarreño industry and washing her father's, who worked in Pizarreño, clothes. In 2018 a court ordered Pizarreño pay 125 million Chilean pesos in indemnity to her surviving family.
- Manuela del Carmen Marín Cabello. She died in July 2012. She was exposed to asbestos coming both from the general environment near her house and from the clothes of her husband who worked in Pizarreño. In 2017 courts ruled Pizarreño to pay 80 million Chilean pesos as indemnity to her sons.
- Patricia Gálvez. As a child she lived in the asbestos-ridden environment next to Pizarreño and played at times in asbestos dunes near her house. As of 2019 she was suffering from pleural mesothelioma, resulting from asbestos exposure. Together with three other women adversely affected by asbestos she has sued Etex Group, the owner of Pizarreño.
