= 2013 Nueva Mayoría presidential primary =

Chilean political primary

Nueva Mayoría presidential primary, 2013
- June 30, 2013
- Turnout: 2,142,070 (16.23%)
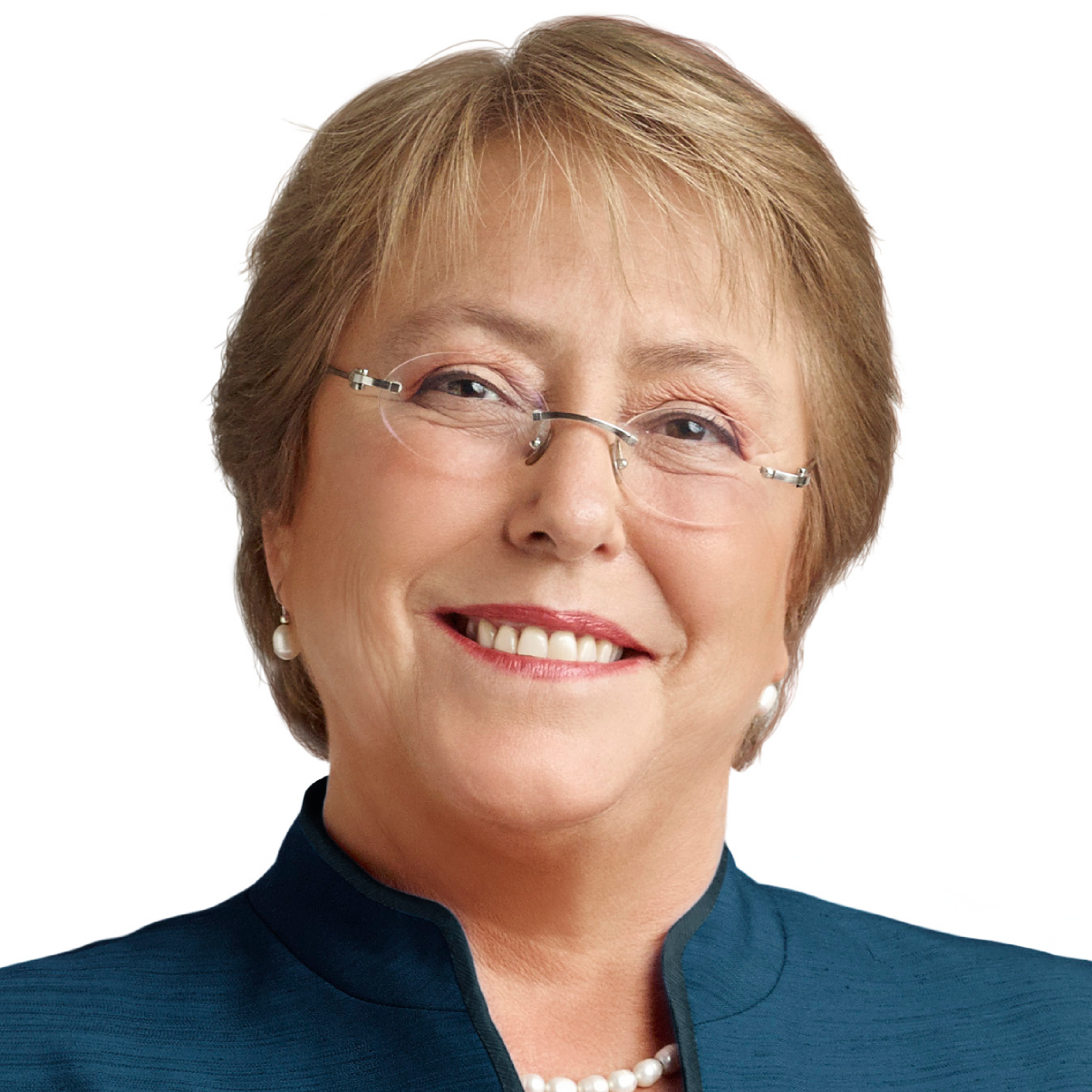

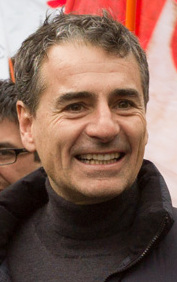

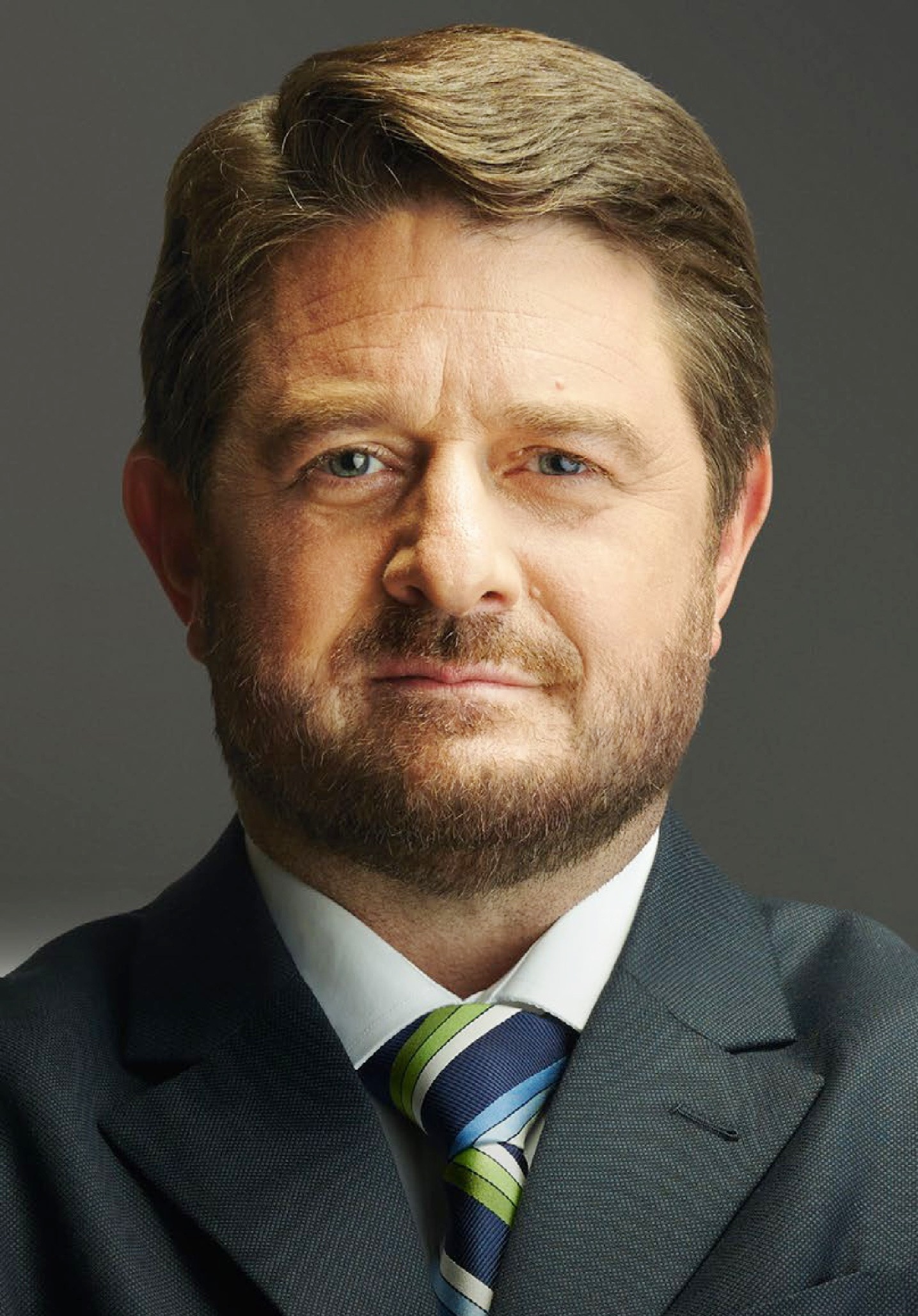

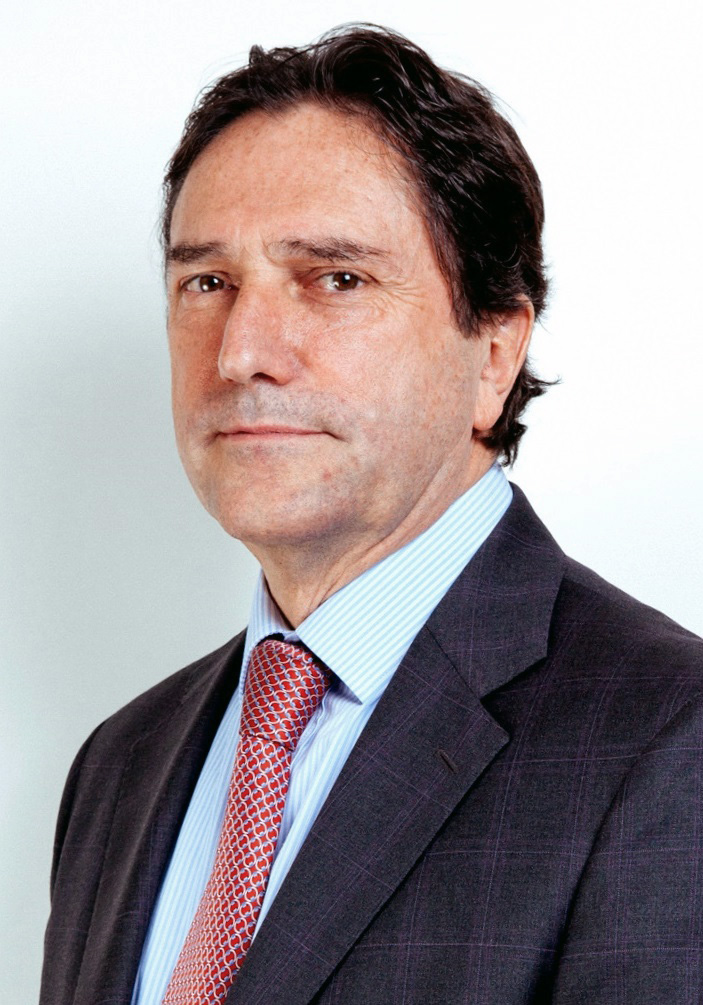
Candidate	Michelle Bachelet Jeria	Andrés Velasco Brañes
Party	Socialist	Independent
Popular vote	1,565,269	278,684
Percentage	73.07%	13.01%
Candidate	Claudio Orrego Larraín	José Antonio Gómez Urrutia
Party	PDC	Social Democrat Radical
Popular vote	189,752	108,365
Percentage	8.86%	5.06%
Previous Presidential Candidate
Eduardo Frei Ruiz-Tagle
PDC
Presidential Candidate
Michelle Bachelet
Socialist

The 2013 presidential primaries of the Nueva Mayoría coalition in Chile determined its candidate for the 2013 presidential election. The coalition brought together the Christian Democrat, Radical Social-Democrat, For Democracy, and Socialist parties (successors to the Concert of Parties for Democracy), alongside the Movimiento Amplio Social, the Communist Party, Citizen Left, and various left- and center-left independents. While parliamentary primaries were initially planned, the coalition decided on 1 May 2013 not to hold them at the official level.

These were the first primary elections held under Chile's 2012 law regulating official primaries, and the first to feature more than two candidates: Michelle Bachelet, José Antonio Gómez, Claudio Orrego, and Andrés Velasco.

Michelle Bachelet, who had served as president from 2006 to 2010, won the nomination with over 73% of the vote, receiving official backing from the Socialist Party, Party for Democracy, the Broad Social Movement, Citizen Left, and the Communist Party. Independent candidate Andrés Velasco placed second with about 13%, followed by Christian Democrat Claudio Orrego with 9% and Radical Party senator José Antonio Gómez with 5%.

== Background ==
Following the 2005 primaries and the defeat of Eduardo Frei by Sebastián Piñera, which led to the first center-right government since the return to democracy, there were calls to reform the Concertación and adopt a broader primary process for the 2013 elections. Meanwhile, Michelle Bachelet's high approval rating at the end of her presidency positioned her as the leading candidate for the next election. Despite relocating to New York to lead UN Women, Bachelet consistently topped polls, outpacing her closest rivals in the primaries by over 40 points and defeating potential right-wing opponents in hypothetical runoffs at every stage. Her strong lead, combined with her initially undecided status, prompted speculation that the Concertación parties might nominate her directly without holding primaries.

== Christian Democratic Party primary ==
Within the Christian Democratic Party of Chile (PDC), there was debate over whether to present an independent candidacy or support Michelle Bachelet if she chose to return to Chile. The party ultimately decided to run its own candidates, with Senator Ximena Rincón publicly announcing her intention in December 2011 and formalizing it on 16 November 2012, and the then mayor of Peñalolén, Claudio Orrego, who announced his candidacy in March 2012.

In November 2012, the PDC decided to hold an internal primary to select its pre-candidate for the Concertación primary, scheduled for 19 January 2013. The primary was open to both PDC members and citizens not registered with another political party.

A total of 56,263 people participated, with the results as follows:

Candidato	Partido	Votos	%
Claudio Orrego Larraín	PDC	33 175	59.21%
Ximena Rincón González	PDC	22 853	40.79%
Total valid		56 028	99.58%
Blank/Void		235	0.48%
Total		56 263	100%

== Coalition expansion ==
In the months before the 2012 municipal elections, discussions emerged about reforming the Concertación to include other left- and center-left parties and movements. In September 2011, the concept of an "Opposing Convergence" as a replacement for the Concertación was proposed, but it never materialized. Several leaders described the Concertación as exhausted or effectively defunct.

Since the 2008 municipal elections, the Concertación had collaborated with the Communist Party and other movements in an instrumental pact, allowing the PC to secure its first deputies under the Binomial system in the 2010 parliamentary elections. In 2012, the prospect of formally integrating these groups into a broader pact gained momentum. The PPD and PRSD created the "For a Fair Chile" list for council elections with the PC, causing friction with the Socialist Party and PDC, who viewed it as signaling the end of the Concertación. Nevertheless, the parties maintained a mayoral pact, adding other movements and holding primaries in 143 communes to select a single candidate for each municipality. The opposition's strong municipal performance, including Josefa Errázuriz's victory in Providencia, strengthened the idea of a larger center-left alliance.

In mid-2012, the Radical Social Democratic Party nominated José Antonio Gómez Urrutia as its presidential candidate. Independent Andres Velasco, who had considered running if Michelle Bachelet declined, announced his pre-candidacy on 16 November 2012. Negotiations with Marco Enríquez-Ominami to include the Progressive Party in the primaries failed, and he opted to run directly in the first round.

In March 2013, Bachelet resigned from UN Women and returned to Chile, expressing her intention to participate in a "great primary" for "a new majority, for a new policy, for a better country." Her candidacy was promptly endorsed by the Socialist Party and Party for Democracy, followed by other movements such as the Broad Social Movement.

In the preceding months, Congress debated bills to establish official primaries organized by the Electoral Service. The law was passed, setting 30 June 2013 as the date for the first official primary, covering both presidential and parliamentary elections. On 30 April, the presidents of the four Concertación parties, along with the Broad Social Movement, Citizen Left, and Communist Party, registered the presidential candidates for the "Nueva Mayoría" pact: Bachelet, Gómez, Orrego, and Velasco. Days later, the pact faced a crisis over disagreements on registering parliamentary primaries. Velasco strongly criticized party leaders and considered withdrawing, but Chilean law barred primary candidates from running in the first round, so he remained in the primary.

Although the Communist Party signed the Nueva Mayoría candidate registration, it initially did not choose which candidate to support. After internal deliberation, it endorsed Bachelet. This decision drew criticism, especially due to previous opposition from some Communist Youth figures, such as Camila Vallejo, and raised concerns among moderate sectors of the former Concertación about the PC's potential participation in government for the first time since 1973.

== Campaign ==
Official campaign anthem of Michelle Bachelet

"Decídete por la dignidad", campaign video of Claudio Orrego

The primaries campaign focused on encouraging participation, in the context of the first official primaries organized by the Servel and under voluntary voting, which had debuted in the previous year's municipal elections.

Michelle Bachelet's campaign emphasized citizen engagement, highlighting people discussing her government program via videos and social media, leveraging her charisma and perceived accessibility. With the motto "I love Chile", she frequently stressed that she had not sought the candidacy but responded to citizens' call. Her campaign highlighted proposals such as drafting a new constitution, establishing free higher education, and implementing a tax reform to fund it, while avoiding details that could alienate her broad base. The campaign also sought to channel the demands of participants in anti-government demonstrations, particularly the 2011 student mobilization, into policy action.

José Antonio Gómez Urrutia focused on concrete, left-leaning proposals, particularly calling for a constituent assembly or the abolition of the AFP pension system. With a comparatively larger campaign budget, Gómez concentrated his efforts mainly on social media.

Andres Velasco initially entered the campaign contingent on Bachelet's decision not to run, using the slogan VOY to distinguish himself. As the campaign progressed, he positioned himself as a candidate of renewal against "old politics", adopting a more inclusive and progressive message under the motto Allá vamos. His campaign featured modern, liberal messaging with phrases such as "Let's get out of the closet" and "Let's abort prejudice".

Claudio Orrego, known primarily as mayor of Peñalolén, sought to establish himself as a statesman. His campaign projected seriousness and responsibility, using dark colors and a prominent red "O". Targeting centrist and conservative voters, some posters highlighted his faith with the phrase "I believe in God, so what?", contrasting with other candidates' secular profiles. With the slogan "Chile Dares", Orrego emphasized addressing abuses and injustices, including through a viral video illustrating citizen indignation.

Two live televised debates were held in the weeks preceding the primary. The first, organized by Canal 13 and CNN Chile, aired on 10 June and was moderated by Daniel Matamala and Montserrat Álvarez. The second, produced by Televisión Nacional de Chile, was broadcast on 23 June and moderated by Mauricio Bustamante. While the first debate focused on policy discussion, the second saw heightened confrontation, particularly between Velasco and Orrego, who were competing for the centrist segment of the electorate to secure second place behind the expected Bachelet victory, potentially enhancing their future political prospects.

== Results ==
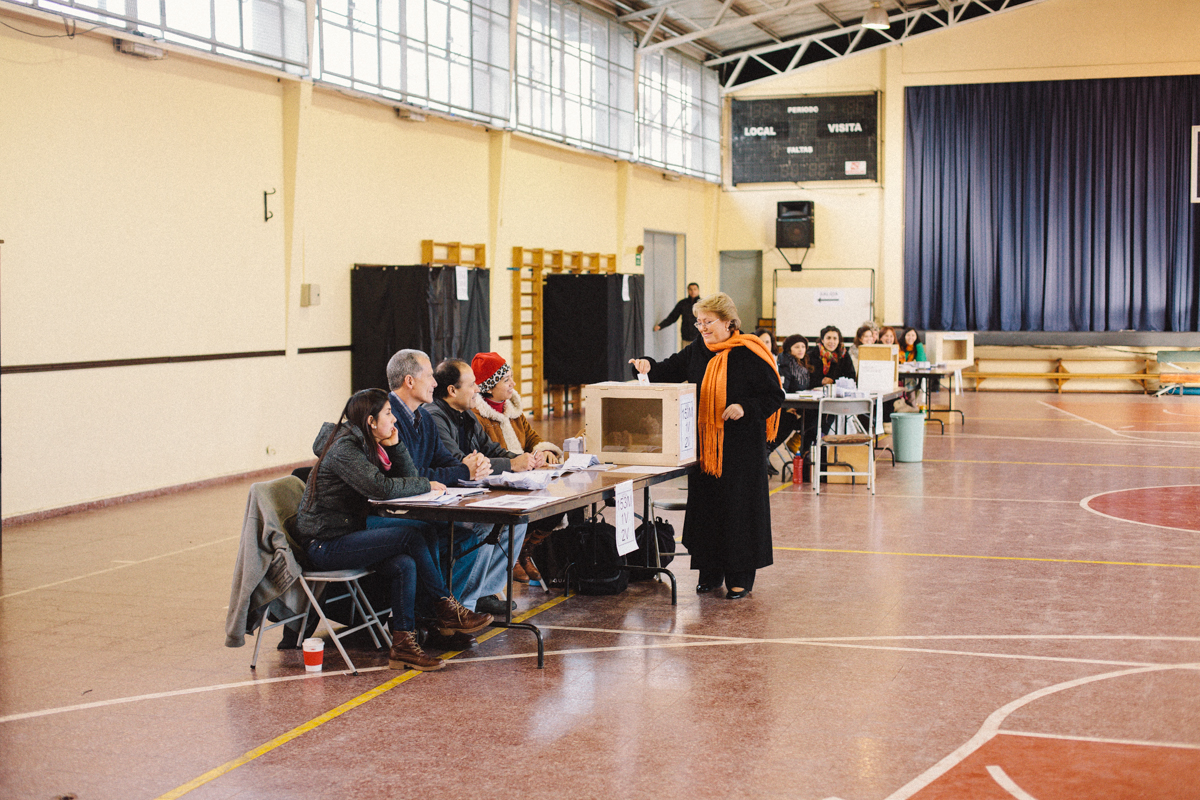
Michelle Bachelet casting her ballot in Santiago

#	Candidate	Party	Endorsement	Votes	%
A1	Michelle Bachelet Jeria	PS	PS-PPD-MAS-PCCh-IC	1,565,269	73.07
A2	José Antonio Gómez Urrutia	PRSD	Partido Radical Socialdemócrata	108,365	5.06
A3	Claudio Orrego Larraín	PDC	Partido Demócrata Cristiano	189,752	8.86
A4	Andrés Velasco Brañes	Ind	Independent	278,684	13.01
Total valid votes				2,142,070	100.00
Total turnout (includes votes cast for candidates in a parallel primary election)				2,950,072	97.98
Null votes				45,986	1.53
Blank votes				14,832	0.49
Total votes				3,010,890	100.00

=== Regional results ===
Candidate	Arica y Parinacota		Tarapacá		Antofagasta		Atacama		Coquimbo	
Michelle Bachelet	15,868	78.29	14,537	72.39	33,436	73.65	25,151	80.87	72,175	82.44
José Antonio Gómez Urrutia	1,015	5.01	1,689	8.41	1,996	4.39	1,640	5.27	3,561	4.06
Claudio Orrego	1,472	7.26	1,515	7.54	3,521	7.75	1,665	5.35	4,886	5.58
Andrés Velasco	1,912	9.43	2,340	11.65	6,441	14.18	2,643	8.49	6,930	7.91
Total	20,267		20,081		45,394		31,099		87,552	
Candidate	Valparaíso		Metropolitana		O'Higgins		Maule		Biobío	
Michelle Bachelet	170,241	72.99	587,550	65.13	90,853	79.26	116,758	83.20	223,380	79.79
José Antonio Gómez Urrutia	13,356	5.72	52,755	5.84	4,651	4.05	4,986	3.55	11,463	4.09
Claudio Orrego	19,350	8.29	101,442	11.24	7,648	6.67	8,220	5.85	20,003	7.14
Andrés Velasco	30,285	12.98	160,298	17.78	11,465	10.00	10,355	7.37	25,160	8.96
Total	233,232		902,045		114,617		140,319		280,006	
Candidate	La Araucanía		Los Ríos		Los Lagos		Aysén		Magallanes	
Michelle Bachelet	80,802	80.35	36,681	81.77	69,691	80.46	9,524	80.90	16,575	78.42
José Antonio Gómez Urrutia	4,238	4.21	2,013	4.48	3,309	3.82	644	5.47	1,014	4.80
Claudio Orrego	7,636	7.59	2,726	6.07	6,945	8.01	878	7.45	1,643	7.77
Andrés Velasco	7,881	7.84	3,437	7.66	6,662	7.69	726	6.16	1,903	9.00
Total	100,557		44,857		86,607		11,772		21,135	
