= Sahr =

Sahr, Sohr, SOHR or SAHR may refer to:

== Iran ==
- Sahr, Isfahan, a village in Jabal Rural District, Kuhpayeh District, Isfahan County, Isfahan Province
- Sohr va Firuzan, a village in Sohr va Firuzan Rural District, Pir Bakran District, Falavarjan County, Isfahan Province

== Other uses ==
- Raúl Sohr (born 1947), Chilean journalist
- Saab Active Head Restraints (SAHR), Saab Active Head Restraint
- Society for Army Historical Research (SAHR)
- Syrian Observatory for Human Rights (SOHR)
