= Bajos de Mena =

Urban sector in Santiago, Chile

Coordinates: 33°37′31″S 70°36′45″W

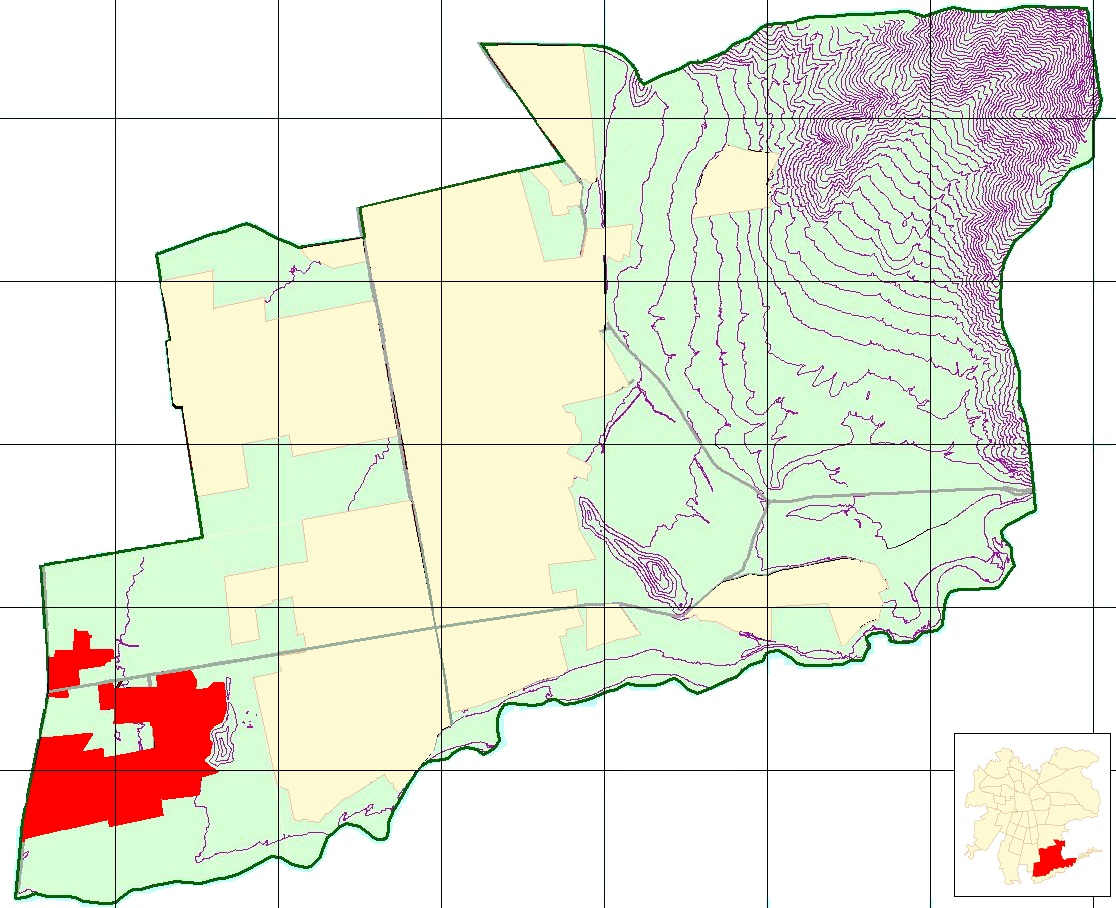
Bajos de Mena (in red) within Puente Alto's map

Bajos de Mena is an urban sector located in the southwest of Puente Alto commune, at the southernmost end of Greater Santiago in Chile.

It is a neglected sector of the city of Santiago, with a lot of poverty and overcrowding population. It has about 140 thousand inhabitants, but it lacks various services such as pharmacies, bank branches, among others. It is almost exclusively made up of social housing built under the government of Eduardo Frei Ruiz-Tagle in the 1990s. These characteristics led to the denomination of the "largest ghetto of Chile".

In the mid-2010s, this situation gradually began to improve thanks to a comprehensive plan for the sector, which included the creation of the Juan Pablo II Park inaugurated in 2013, the construction of the 66th Carabineros police station inaugurated in 2017, and the demolition and removal of buildings and debris from Villa El Volcán, for the construction of a civic center instead.

Due to its large population -similar to cities such as Curicó and Punta Arenas-, its geographic isolation, its lack of services and a considerable distance of 5 km to the civic center of Puente Alto -which is also the most populated commune in Chile-, there are proposals for the sector to achieve communal independence, in conjunction with neighboring parts of La Pintana and San Bernardo.

== History ==
=== Origin ===
In 1886 the Mena family owned an extensive territory on the north bank of the Maipo River. Manuel Mena ceded the lands to the Catholic Church, which were initially transferred to the priest Benjamin Varas. This legal process lasted until 1903, the year in which this land began to function for cemetery uses. This legal process of territorial transfer was extended in time since it had to be in the name of a group of archbishoprics of the time to avoid any conflict of interest that could arise. This cemetery started identified with the Catholic creed, however, access to other religions was allowed, without exception, and in fact at the time practically all the surrounding communes buried their relatives in it, generating a burial rhythm that varied between the 10 and 15 burials daily.

=== From 1994 to 2012: The largest ghetto of Chile ===
The land was forged as a small neighborhood in the 1960s, but the origin of social housing and its overcrowding dates from the social policies of the 1990s, under the government of former president Eduardo Frei Ruiz-Tagle.

The history of Bajos de Mena is one of the most shameful episodes in terms of social housing construction in Chile. In 1994, measures taken by the Minister of Housing at the time, Edmundo Hermosilla, increased the population density in Puente Alto to 600 inhabitants per hectare. Two years later, in 1997, after intense winter rains, it was discovered that the houses built in the villages of El Volcán I, II, and III, by Copeva Company, owned by the brother of former minister Edmundo Pérez Yoma, made water, damaging hundreds of residents. The solution, which was to cover the buildings with long plastic bands, ended up offering a regrettable spectacle and a lack of respect for those who put their illusions and their savings in the failed real estate project. The news of two horses given by Francisco Pérez Yoma, owner of Copeva, to the minister Hermosilla two years earlier, was the last straw for him to resign amid the scandal.

The sector never had the necessary services to create a “neighborhood” and despite the deficiencies, hundreds of families continued to arrive and in less than a decade 23,000 homes were built in Bajos de Mena. With these characteristics, many ended up returning to the places from which they had arrived (illegal housing or other shanty towns) when they realized that "the high-rise social condominiums" as the Government called them at that time, had flaws and there were no public furniture. The place ended up being transformed into a nest for the reproduction of crime, drug trafficking and sexual violence, with very poor levels of human development index, far from average Chilean levels and extremely unequal to the Northeastern zone of Santiago de Chile (0.96 HDI). Faced with so much helplessness, the solution was to demolish the houses, but everything happened at low speed and the streets of Bajos de Mena, in addition to accumulating garbage, were filled with rubble and half-demolished buildings, with an appearance comparable to a bombed area in which the children played with dead dogs. By 2012, according to a Ciper study on social segregation, the services that in other sectors of Santiago are just around the corner, in the Villa El Volcán were several kilometers away. Pharmacies almost a kilometer away; banks, exclusively in the Plaza de Puente Alto (5 km); only two fire companies, the first and third from Puente Alto, 4 and 2.5 kilometers respectively, and Carabineros almost 4 kilometers away. Current governor of Santiago Metropolitan Region, Claudio Orrego, pointed out in 2014 that Bajos de Mena represented the best example of what "not to do" in terms of public policies for social housing and urban planning.

=== Since 2012: Urban Rehabilitation Plan ===
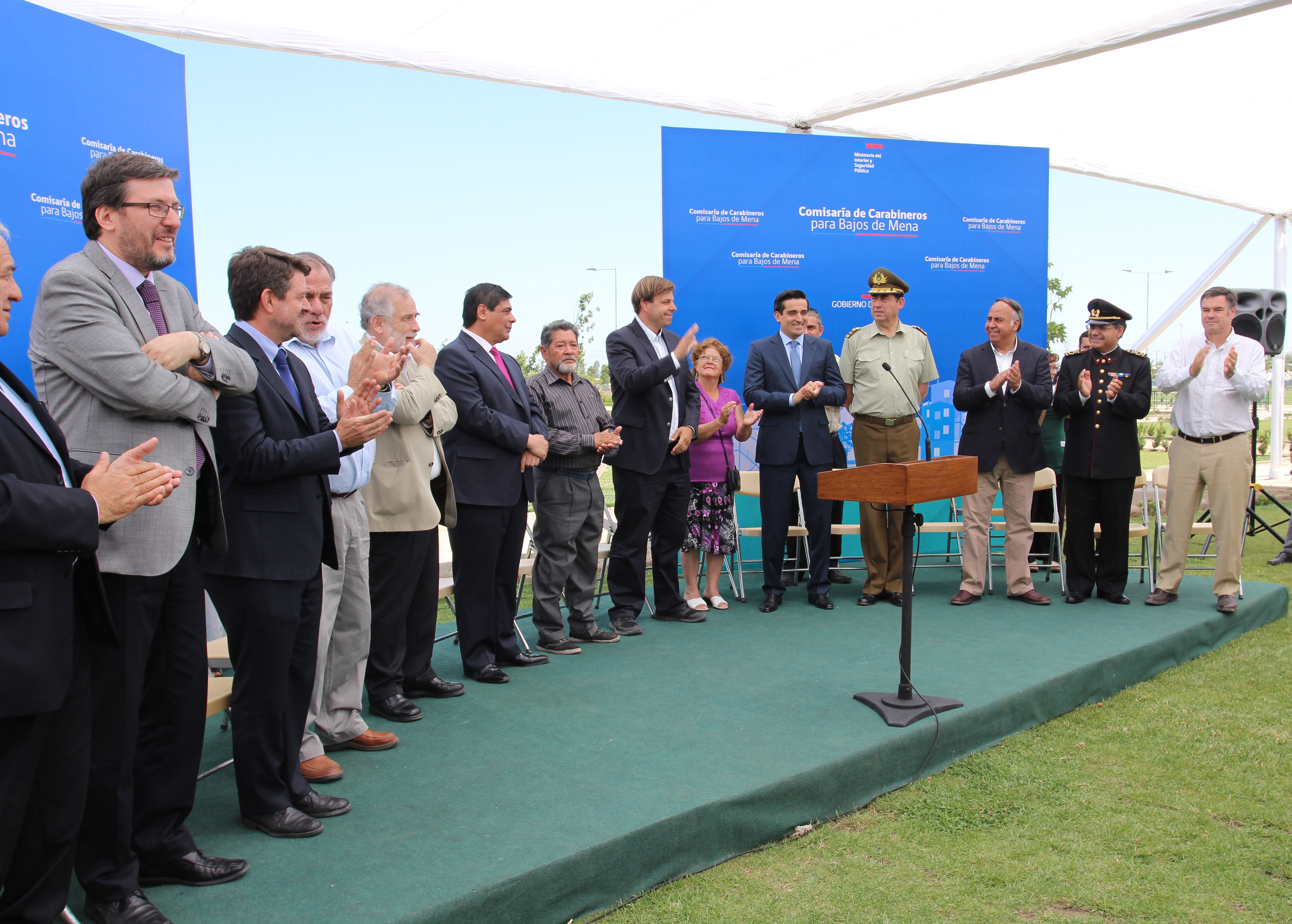
Authorities announce urban rehabilitation plans

After years of unfulfilled political promises and poorly implemented projects, in 2012 the "Comprehensive Urban Rehabilitation Plan for Bajos de Mena" was executed, allowing significant changes in the sector. In 2013 the Juan Pablo II Park was inaugurated, in what was the illegal landfill "la cañamera", the 66th police station of the Carabineros de Chile was installed, inaugurated in 2017, the demolition and removal of abandoned buildings and debris in Villa El Volcán, the eighth fire company department of Puente Alto was inaugurated, two new kindergartens and nurseries are inaugurated, giving rise to a civic center for the sector. In addition, the construction of new neighborhoods with urban quality standards is defined and several streets are extended to generate a better connection between them, building a road network until then intricate and labyrinthine. In November 2017, the first phase of Hospital Provincia Cordillera was inaugurated, just 2 km from the center of Bajos de Mena, and it is expected to be fully inaugurated by 2022.

In May 2018, President Sebastián Piñera announced the extension of Line 4 of the Santiago Metro with 3 more stations to the west of Plaza de Puente Alto metro station, reaching Avenida Eyzaguirre with Avenida Juanita in the center of Bajos de Mena. The inauguration date is estimated for the year 2028.

== Sites of interest ==
=== Juan Pablo II Park ===
Inaugurated at the end of April 2014, it is a park that has more than 13 hectares of land, located in a sector formerly known as La Cañamera, which had functioned as an illegal landfill. The park has a 13-meter-high statue of John Paul II, which was donated by the San Sebastián University. It was originally intended to be installed in the Bellavista neighborhood, but after a controversy it was rejected by the Council of National Monuments of Chile because its size broke with urban planning canons and the harmony of the place. The statue was inaugurated by Cardinal Ricardo Ezzati Andrello, on April 27, 2014, the day of the canonization of John Paul II, with a mass in the park that was attended by five thousand faithful.

== See also ==
- La Pintana
- Campamento (Chile)
