= Governor of the Santiago Metropolitan Region =

Elected official in Chile

Governor of Santiago Metropolitan Region
- Gobernador de la Región Metropolitana de Santiago

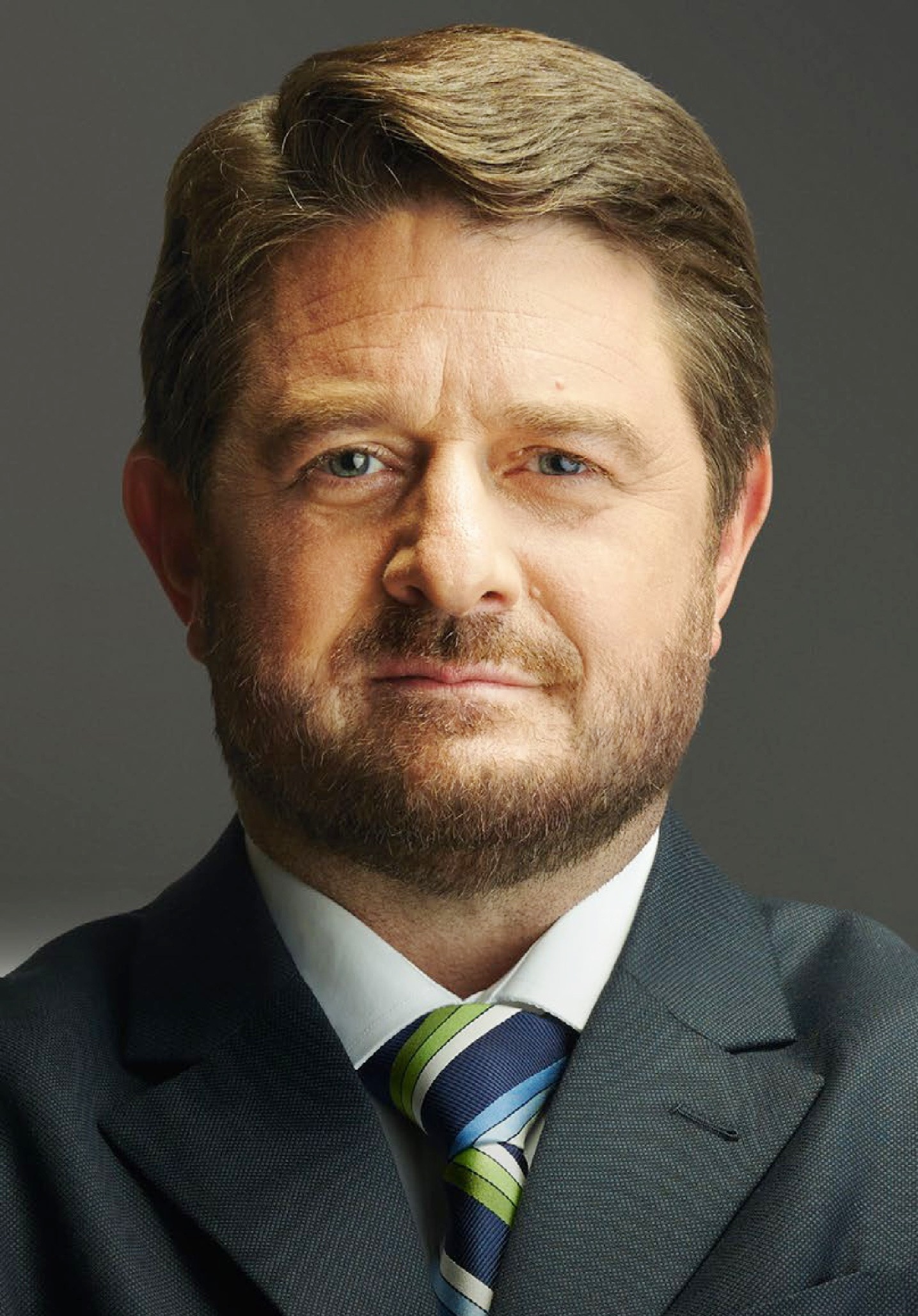
- Incumbent; Claudio Orrego since July 14, 2021
- Santiago Metropolitan Region
- Appointer: Electorate of Santiago Metropolitan Region
- Term length: Four years, renewable once
- Inaugural holder: Claudio Orrego
- Formation: July 14, 2021
- Website: www.gobiernosantiago.cl

The Governor of the Santiago Metropolitan Region is the authority elected by popular vote through universal suffrage since 2021 to govern the Santiago Metropolitan Region, Chile.

== History ==
The 2017 constitutional reform established the popular election of the executive body of the regional government, creating the position of Regional governor (gobernador regional) and setting up a Delegado presidencial regional (regional presidential delegation), who represents the President of Chile in the region and oversees the regions alongside provincial presidential delegates.

The first regional governor elections in Chile were held on May 15 and 16, 2021, with the elected officials assuming their duties on July 14 of the same year.

Former minister and intendant Claudio Orrego won the election for the Santiago Metropolitan Region, becoming the first person to hold that position. On November 24, 2024, Orrego was reelected for a second term.

== Governor of the Metropolitan Region of Santiago ==
Portrait	Governor	Term of office			Party
Portrait	Governor	Start	End	Duration	Party
	Claudio Orrego	July 14, 2021	Incumbent	5 years, 56 days	PDC (2021–2022) Independent (2022–)
