= Control of Asbestos Regulations 2006 =

United Kingdom statotory legislation

- Statutory Instrument
- Parliament of the United Kingdom
- Citation: SI 2006/2739

Dates
- Made: 12 October 2006
- Laid before Parliament: 20 October 2006
- Commencement: 13 November 2006
- Revoked: 6 April 2012

Other legislation
- Repeals/revokes: Asbestos (Licensing) Regulations 1983; Asbestos (Prohibitions) Regulations 1992; Asbestos (Licensing) (Amendment) Regulations 1998; Asbestos (Prohibitions) (Amendment) Regulations 1999; Asbestos (Prohibitions) (Amendment) (No. 2) Regulations 1999; Control of Asbestos at Work Regulations 2002; Asbestos (Prohibitions) (Amendment) Regulations 2003
- Made under: Health and Safety at Work etc. Act 1974; European Communities Act 1972
- Transposes: Directive 76/769/EEC; Directive 83/477/EEC; Directive 90/394/EEC; Directive 98/24/EC
- Revoked by: Control of Asbestos Regulations 2012

Status: Revoked

Text of statute as originally enacted

The Control of Asbestos Regulations 2006 (SI 2006/2739) came into force in the United Kingdom on 13 November 2006 and brought together a number of other asbestos related pieces of legislation. This has been superseded by the Control of Asbestos Regulations 2012 (SI 2012/632). The pieces of legislation the regulations revoked and replaced were the Control of Asbestos at Work Regulations 2002 (SI 2002/2675), the Asbestos (Licensing) Regulations 1983 (SI 1983/1649) and the Asbestos (Prohibitions) Regulations 1992 (SI 1992/3067). Key elements of the regulations include a greater emphasis on training requiring anyone who may come into contact with asbestos in the course of their work to be given suitable training. Greater restrictions were also placed on the amount of exposure workers could be exposed to in the form of 'control limits'. The recently published 'Asbestos: The survey guide' (HSG264) is complementary to these regulations. When work with asbestos is being carried out the regulations place a requirement on employers and self-employed workers to prevent exposure to asbestos fibres.

== Duties arising from the regulations ==
The Control of Asbestos Regulations 2006 brought together three separate pieces of legislation which covered the prohibition of asbestos, the control of asbestos at work and asbestos licensing. They prohibited the import, supply and use of all types of asbestos and also continued to ban the second hand use of asbestos products such as asbestos boards and tiles. The regulations require mandatory training to be given to anyone who may be exposed to asbestos whilst at work. This regulation will enable contracted workers on site to assess correctly the nature of a material before work is carried out, thus eliminating the risk of uncontrolled damage to Asbestos Containing Materials. Maintenance workers who may be coming onto a premises to carry out a job must also be given training. Should work need to be carried out that may result in the disturbing of asbestos then all measures should be taken to limit the exposure to asbestos fibres. Any exposure to those fibres should be below the 'airborne exposure limit' of 0.1 fibres per cm³. The control limit is the maximum concentration of asbestos fibres in the air if measured over any continuous 4 hour period. Any short term exposure to asbestos, as measured by continuous exposure over 10 minutes, should not exceed 0.6 fibres per cm³. These exposures must be strictly controlled with respiratory protective equipment if exposure can be reduced in no other way. In terms of asbestos removal, any work should be carried out by a licensed contractor although any decision as to whether work is 'licensable' is based on the risk. Anyone working on asbestos under the regulations must have a license issued by the Health and Safety Executive. (Note: HSE Web Site - Control of Asbestos Regulations There are a number of exceptions to whether work is licensable. These usually apply if it is clear from the risk assessment that any exposure will not exceed the control limit and the work is short and non-continuous; the work is to do with the sealing of asbestos containing materials and the material is in a good condition; air monitoring and control as in the collection of samples to determine whether a particular product contains asbestos.)

== Prosecutions arising from the regulations ==
On 9 June 2009 a company in Swansea, Val Inco Europe Ltd, pleaded guilty to four charges under the Control of Asbestos Regulations 2006 and were fined £12,000 and ordered to pay £28,000 costs. The charges were in relation to work carried out by a contractor, A-Weld, on a furnace at the companies premises. Although asbestos surveys had been carried out on their site, the interior of the plant and equipment had not been surveyed. As a result, asbestos insulation material was disturbed and broken potentially giving rise to powders and fibres. Workers on the site also discovered a 'white material' which they believed to be asbestos and although the sample was sent away for tests, the site was not isolated and the work was allowed to continue. HSE principal inspector Andrew Knowles said that an "important aspect was the failure to provide asbestos awareness training for employees, which is a specific requirement where asbestos may be present in a workplace". He added "The failures in this case were entirely preventable and the defendant fell far short of the high standards required. This should serve as a warning to others about the dangers of asbestos and the legal requirement to manage it properly."

== Asbestos and associated health risks ==
Asbestos is a naturally occurring group of silicate minerals that can readily be separated into thin strong fibres that are flexible, heat resistant and chemically inert. Within the United Kingdom and elsewhere in the world, asbestos was used extensively as a building material from the 1950s to the 1980s. It was used as a means of fireproofing as well as insulation and any building built before 2000 could contain asbestos. Although asbestos can be safe if the material is kept in good condition and undisturbed, if damaged asbestos fibres could become airborne and cause serious risks to health if inhaled. Serious diseases including mesothelioma, lung cancer, and asbestosis could result if someone were to breathe in high levels of asbestos fibres. A particular risk if someone were to be working either on, or with, asbestos materials which had been damaged. There are six forms of asbestos although only three are commonly used, these are Chrysotile (white asbestos), the most common; Amosite (brown asbestos) which can often be found in ceiling tiles and as a fire retardant in thermal insulation products; Crocidolite (blue asbestos), commonly used in high temperature applications.
