= Sergio Henríquez =

Chilean politician

Minister Secretary General of Government
- In office 24 July 1997 – 11 March 2000
- President: Eduardo Frei Ruíz-Tagle
- Preceded by: Edmundo Hermosilla
- Succeeded by: Claudio Orrego

Personal details
- Born: 25 March 1955 (age 71) Santiago, Chile
- Party: Close to the Christian Democratic Party
- Spouse: María Soledad Gutiérrez Perelló
- Children: Four
- Education: University of Chile (BA)
- Occupation: Politician
- Profession: Business administrator; Economist

Sergio Luis Alberto Henríquez Díaz (born 25 March 1955) is a Chilean politician who was minister of State under Eduardo Frei Ruíz-Tagle's government (1994–2000).

He was part of the board of Ripley S.A., Chilean retail company. Similarly, he is president of Casa de Moneda.

== Biography ==
Henríquez studied business administration (ingeniería comercial) at the University of Chile and later completed executive education courses at the Adolfo Ibáñez University.

For many years he worked in the private sector, specializing in project development and the capital market. He also taught at the University of Chile, the University of Santiago, Chile, the Diego Portales University, and the Chilean Naval Engineering School.

During the 1990s, Henríquez was chief executive officer of O'Higgins Asesorías Financieras and O'Higgins Agente de Valores, both companies belonging to the Luksic Group. In 1995, he became chief executive officer of the state-owned water utility Esval, which was privatized a few years later.

== Public career ==
In 1997, President Eduardo Frei Ruiz-Tagle appointed him Minister of Housing and Urbanism, replacing Edmundo Hermosilla. Hermosilla had resigned after publicly acknowledging that he had accepted a horse as a gift from Francisco Pérez Yoma, owner of Copeva, during the controversy surrounding the company's housing developments.

Henríquez's appointment was widely attributed to his close relationship with Francisco Frei and Gutenberg Martínez, connections that had also reportedly influenced his earlier appointment at Esval.

During the administration of President Ricardo Lagos, he was chairman of the state-owned Polla Chilena de Beneficencia. Under President Michelle Bachelet, he was appointed chairman of the Chilean Postal Service.

Because of his close relationship with Eduardo Frei Ruiz-Tagle, Henríquez was regarded as one of Frei's principal advisers during the 2009 Chilean presidential election.

He also was chairman of the Commercial Engineering Specialty Council of the Chilean Institute of Engineers.

He is a member of the Board of Directors of the Central University of Chile.
