= 2013 Alianza presidential primary =

Chilean political primary

Alianza presidential primary, 2013
- 30 June 2013
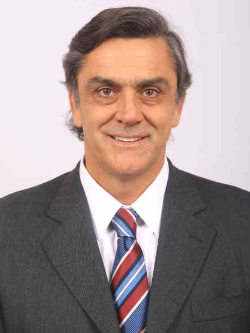

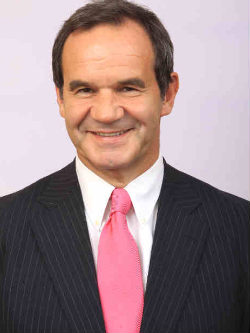
Candidate	Pablo Longueira	Andrés Allamand
Party	UDI	National Renewal
Popular vote	414,380	392,221
Percentage	51.37%	48.63%
Previous Presidential Candidate
Sebastián Piñera Echenique
National Renewal
Presidential Candidate
Evelyn Matthei Fornet
UDI

The presidential primaries of the Alliance of 2013 were the method of election of the presidential candidate of such Chilean center-right coalition, for the presidential election of 2013. On that same date the conglomerate would also realize its parliamentary primaries in the districts but the UDI decided not to participate in them, being reduced to the candidates of National Renewal (RN).

It was the first time that the Alliance held primary elections in its history, since its origins as the Democracy and Progress pact in 1989, joining the process just established by the law of primaries approved during 2012.]

UDI candidate Pablo Longueira managed to obtain 51.37% of the votes of the primary, surpassing the representative of RN Andrés Allamand. Yet, soon after he resigned due to a diagnosis of clinical depression. Labor Minister Evelyn Matthei was then nominated as the Alliance's candidate.

== History and development ==
The right-wing coalition (which has had various names such as Democracia y Progreso, Alianza por Chile and Coalición por el Cambio) has never held primary elections to define its presidential candidate. In some elections, such as those of 1989, 1999 and 2009, a consensus was reached between the two main parties of the coalition (National Renewal and Independent Democrat Union), while in the 2005 elections both parties preferred to bring their two candidates up to the first round instead of performing primaries.

== Definition of applications ==
With a view to the presidential elections of 2013, the Alliance focused its expectations on the ministers of the government of Sebastián Piñera with greater popularity. The independent Laurence Golborne had a rapid rise in the polls in 2010 after successfully achieving the rescue of the 33 miners trapped in Atacama while he served as Minister of Mining, later going to the Ministry of Energy and then to Public Works. Historical senators of the Right wing that sounded like potential successors of Sebastián Piñera were incorporated during 2011 to the cabinet of Piñera to reinforce it before the different crises that its government lived: in January entered Andam Allamand (RN) and Evelyn Matthei (UDI) to the ministries of Defense and Labor, Respectively, while Pablo Longueira (UDI) would do to Economy in late June. Although the three appeared with presidential options, Allamand managed to stand out especially after the work of rescue of the accident of the C-212 Aviocar of the Air Force of Chile.

Laurence Golborne, who was the Minister of Mining, Energy and Public Works of the government of Sebastián Piñera, was the most competitive letter to face the presidential elections.4 Despite the initial support of the UDI, finally had to leave his candidacy and give way to Pablo Longueira.

Already in 2012, Allamand and Golborne looked like those destined to be the candidates for the Alliance, and the prospect of a primary school was envisaged, boosted by the fact that the primary law was passed, which would give them official status for the first time. Following the strong electoral defeat that the ruling party experienced in the October municipal elections, it was decided to specify the departure of the cabinet of both figures on November 5 to boost their campaigns and avoid a victory of the Concertación in the following elections. Two days later, both ministers announced their respective candidatures.

== Golborne fall and replacement by Longueira ==
Although most polls ranked Laurence Golborne as the best card to face Michelle Bachelet's potential bid in the November 2013 elections, the idea began that Andrés Allamand had considerably reduced his distance from Laurence Golborne, who Faced his first election to a popular position and that had been chosen as candidate of the UDI although he was not affiliated to that party.

A few days after the official registration of the candidates for the primary elections, a succession of conflicts sullied Golborne's candidacy.8 At the end of April 2013, a ruling by the Supreme Court of Chile condemned Cencosud-holding That Golborne was former general manager to be minister - by unilateral rises in the commissions of the credit card of the company; Golborne said that the increases, made during his term, had been approved by the board of the company and that he had only complied. The UDI candidate's response was widely disputed by Allamand, who took the opportunity to give a major blow to his opponent's candidacy: he said that Cencosud's attitude had been "abusive" and that Golborne had to decide whether to defend or not the consumers. Allamand's strategy outraged the UDI, putting even the completion of the primaries in check, but also raised strong criticism of Golborne's wrong reaction. In the same days, the estate declaration was made public when he was a minister, omitting a company owned by him that was registered in the Virgin Islands, known as a tax haven.9 10 Although Golborne defended himself by saying that society was Declared as part of another and that his existence was not an irregularity, the information was fatal for his candidacy. An important number of historical militants expressed their dissatisfaction with having a candidate who did not come from their ranks, who did not share the values of the UDI and lost ground to Allamand. The bench of deputies requested to lower the candidacy of Golborne and to take a proper candidacy to the first return.

In the midst of this crisis, the UDI board decided in a few hours to withdraw its support for Laurence Golborne's candidacy and to define a new candidate. After shuffling the name of Evelyn Matthei, finally they decided to bet for Pablo Longueira, one of the personages more respected by the militants of the UDI. Golborne resigned his candidacy on April 29, stating that "I am here for the people, but people are not enough, the support of a cohesive, organized and well-led party is needed." Longueira quickly assumed his new position, Resigning his ministerial position and ensuring the realization of primaries, before the attempts to cancel them and go to the first round. UDI president Patricio Melero said days later that they would not participate in parliamentary primaries (a mechanism that would use RN) to "concentrate all our energies on Pablo Longueira being the candidate of the Alliance".

== Results ==
=== National ===
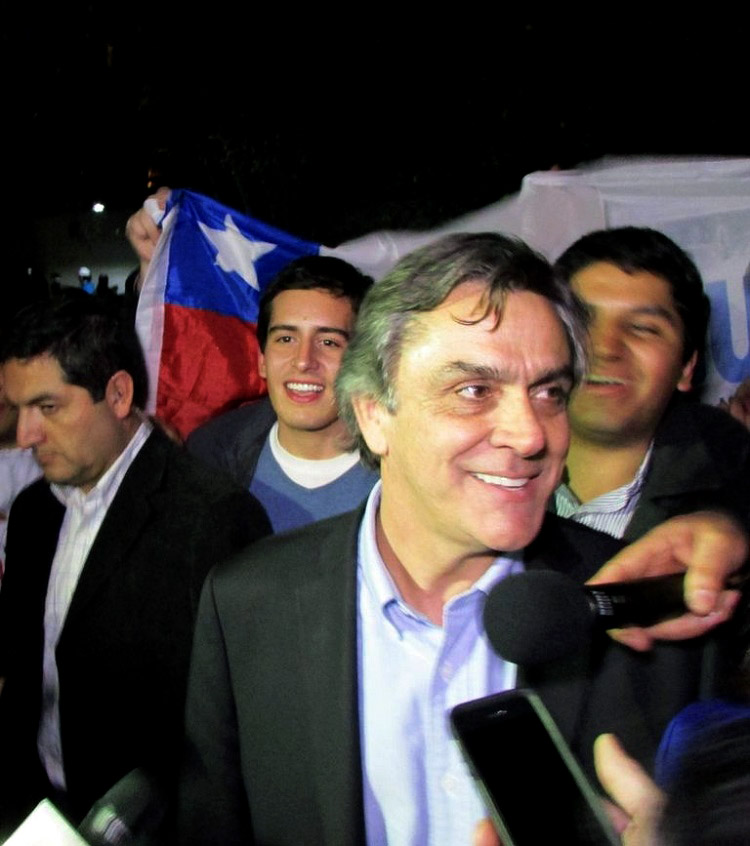
Pablo Longueira celebrate triumph.

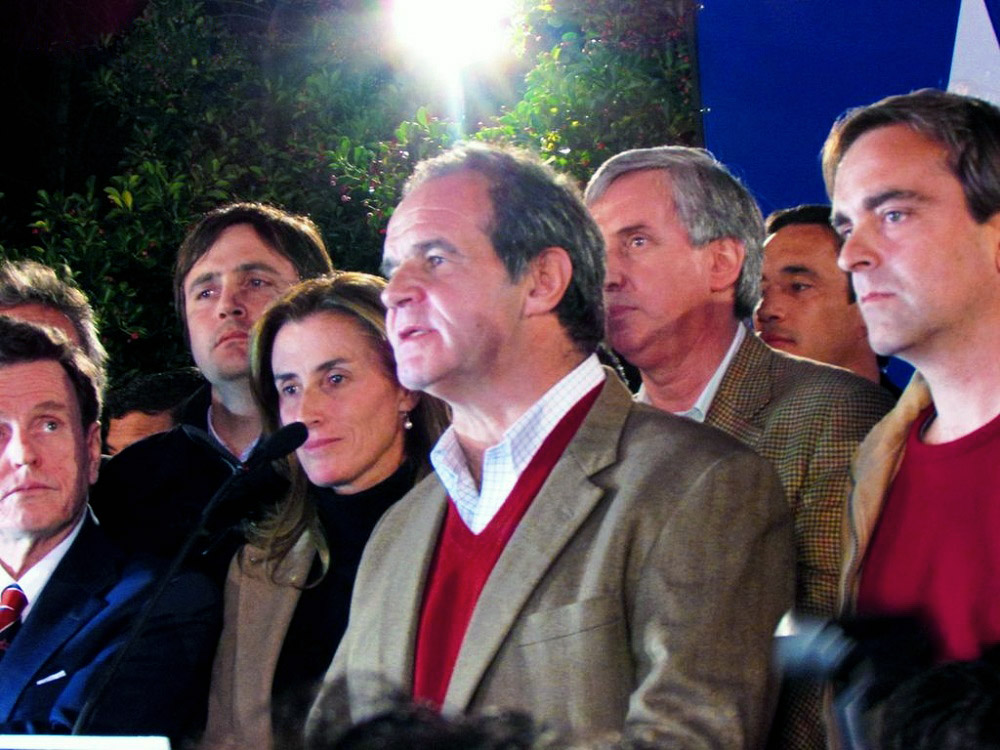
Andrés Allamand acknowledges defeit.

N°^{?}	Candidate	Party	Support	Votes	%
B5	Pablo Longueira Montes	UDI	Unión Demócrata Independiente	415 087	51,37%
B6	Andrés Allamand Zavala	RN	Renovación Nacional	392 915	48,63
Total				808 002	27,39 %
Valid				2 950 072	97,98 %
Void				45 986	1,53 %
Blank				14 832	0,49 %
Total				3 010 890	100 %

=== Regions ===
Candidate	Arica y Parinacota		Tarapacá		Antofagasta		Atacama		Coquimbo	
Pablo Longueira	4122	52,17 %	4388	51,14 %	6395	47,30 %	3861	49,12 %	10 744	48,98 %
Andrés Allamand	3778	47,82 %	4192	48,85 %	7125	52,69 %	3998	50,87 %	11 190	51,01 %
Total	7900		8580		13 472		7859		21 934	
Candidate	Valparaíso		Metropolitana		O'Higgins		Maule		Biobío	
Pablo Longueira	49 808	52,53 %	200 557	53,64 %	20 808	53,49 %	23 232	53,29 %	41 500	45,94 %
Andrés Allamand	45 003	47,46 %	173 278	46,35 %	18 092	46,50 %	20 361	46,70 %	48 834	54,05 %
Total	94 811		373 835		38 900		43 593		90 334	
Candidate	La Araucanía		Los Ríos		Los Lagos		Aisén		Magallanes	
Pablo Longueira	21 148	46,03 %	8037	45,87 %	14 559	48,00 %	2460	46,57 %	2808	44,42 %
Andrés Allamand	24 792	53,96 %	9483	54,12 %	15 768	51,99 %	2822	53,42 %	3513	55,57 %
Total	45 940		17 520		30 327		5282		6321	

== Reactions ==
The participation in the primary of the Alliance was considerably smaller than that of the New Majority, center-left coalition; Three out of four votes went to the latter. This caused some sectors of the Alliance to be very self-critical with this result, especially the candidate for Senator Manuel Jose Ossandón, who affirmed that "the Government and the Alliance were the culprits of the results".

On the night when the results of the primary were announced, Andrés Allamand attended the UDI headquarters to congratulate Longueira for the triumph, but the meeting was not public; At that moment Allamand would have rebuked the Longueira's Generalissimo, Joaquin Lavin, who was accused of humiliating him. Lavin, in the days that followed, apologized to Allamand.

On July 17, 2013, in a surprise decision even within the Alliance, the family of Pablo Longueira announced that he was lowering his candidacy for a depression that had been medically diagnosed.19 With this, and according to the primary election legislation, Parties of the Alliance could nominate their own candidate for the election, or decide to appoint a candidate in common.20 Shortly afterwards, on Saturday 20 of the same month, Labor Minister Evelyn Matthei was nominated by the UDI as her presidential candidate.21 On August 10 he received the support of National Renewal.
