= Rohn Industries =

American communications tower company

ROHN Products, LLC
- Type: Private
- Founded: 1948; 78 years ago Bellevue, Illinois, U.S.
- Founder: Dwight Rohn
- Headquarters: Peoria, Illinois, U.S.
- Area served: Worldwide
- Products: Products List: Self Supporting Towers; Guyed Mast; Poles; Utility Structures; Platforms; Telescoping Masts
- Parent: O'Brien Steel Service Company
- Website: www.rohnnet.com

ROHN Products, LLC, formerly ROHN Industries, Inc. and UNR Industries, Inc., is a manufacturer of telecommunications towers, poles, utility structures, mounts, and other materials. ROHN products include support structures for antennas, private microwave, cellular telephone, personal communications systems, commercial broadcasting, and amateur radio.

== History ==
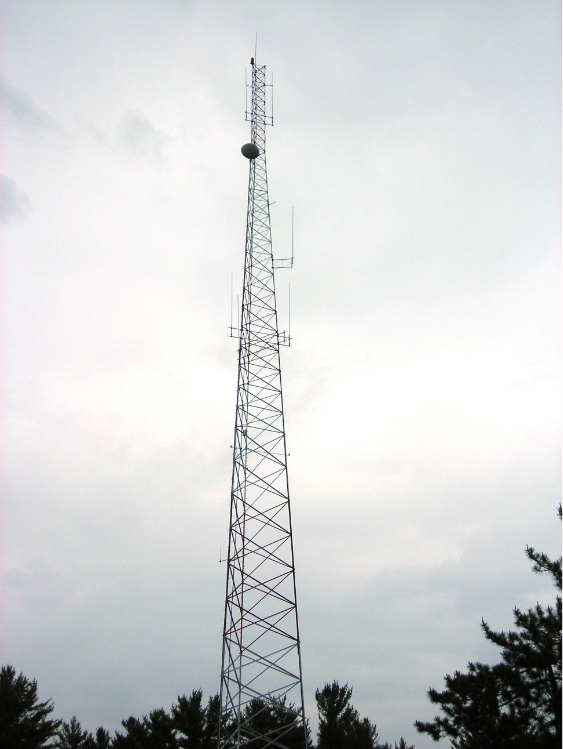
275-foot galvanized steel, self-supporting tower manufactured by ROHN.

ROHN Manufacturing was founded in 1948 by Dwight Rohn, who at the time was manager of the Peoria Airport. The first tower he built was for airport use. ROHN first began producing antenna towers for home television reception, and subsequently expanded its product line to include the manufacturing of telecommunication towers and other communication products, including broadcast towers of up to 2,000 feet high. ROHN towers have been installed all over the world.

The company was family-owned until it was sold to UNARCO Industries in the 1971. UNARCO Industries, Inc. declared bankruptcy in 1982 and was reorganized as UNR Industries, Inc., later changing the name to ROHN Industries, Inc. In 2003, ROHN Industries, Inc. was acquired by Radian Corporation and in 2008 ROHN Products, LLC became independent again. In 2008, ROHN Products, LLC was acquired by O'Brien Steel Service Co.
