= Edmundo Hermosilla =

Chilean politician

Minister of Housing and Urbanism
- In office 11 March 1994 – 24 July 1997
- President: Eduardo Frei Ruíz-Tagle
- Preceded by: Alberto Etchegaray
- Succeeded by: Sergio Henríquez

Personal details
- Born: 13 July 1956 (age 70) Río Bueno, Chile
- Party: Christian Democratic Party
- Spouse: Roxana Varas
- Children: Five
- Education: University of Chile (B.Sc)
- Occupation: Politician
- Profession: Business administrator Economist

Edmundo Hermosilla Hermosilla (born 13 July 1956) is a Chilean politician who served as minister of State under Eduardo Frei Ruíz-Tagle's government (1994–2000).

He was president of the retail company CMR Fallabella.

== Early life ==
Hermosilla completed his primary education at the public school in Río Bueno and his secondary education at the Instituto Salesiano de Valdivia. In 1973, he enrolled at the University of Chile, where he earned a degree in business administration (ingeniero comercial).

He began his professional career at the finance company Finamsur before joining the Banco A. Edwards. He later moved to Citibank Chile, where he rose to the position of vice president.

In March 1990, following the inauguration of President Patricio Aylwin, Hermosilla became Manager of Development and State-Owned Enterprises at the Production Development Corporation (CORFO), where he oversaw the privatization of the corporation's financial assets. During this period, he also was chairman of Edelnor and as a director of Esval, among other state-controlled companies.

Between 1992 and 1994, he was chief executive officer of Banco BHIF, a bank controlled by the Said family. During his tenure, he led the institution's legal dispute with businessman Francisco Javier Errázuriz Talavera, the former owner of Banco Nacional, which BHIF had acquired.

In February 1993, while attending the World Economic Forum in Switzerland, he was selected as one of the organization's 200 Global Leaders for Tomorrow.

== Ministerial career ==
Supported by leading Christian Democratic figures, including his friend Gutenberg Martínez, Hermosilla was appointed Minister of Housing and Urbanism by President Eduardo Frei Ruiz-Tagle in March 1994. He served until July 1997. During his tenure, he promoted major urban development initiatives, including the National Urban Development Policy and the construction of approximately 500,000 housing units.

His ministerial career came to an abrupt end in 1997 following the Copeva housing scandal. Nearly 7,000 homes built by the company in the Bajos de Mena neighborhood of Puente Alto suffered severe flooding, exposing serious deficiencies in government oversight. The controversy intensified after it became public that Hermosilla had received a mare as a gift from Francisco Pérez Yoma, owner of Copeva, shortly after the housing contract had been signed. Although Hermosilla maintained that the gift had no influence on his official duties and personally initiated legal proceedings against Copeva, the scandal ultimately led to his resignation.

== Later life ==
After leaving the Ministry of Housing and Urbanism, Hermosilla joined Dersa, the holding company of the Del Río business group, which later became a shareholder of Falabella. He was the company's chief executive officer until August 2009, after which he remained on the boards of several subsidiaries, including Banco Falabella and Derco.

Hermosilla is also a shareholder of Azul Azul, the company that holds the concession to operate the assets of Universidad de Chile football club.

Since April 2014, he has been chairman of CMR Falabella.

He is married to catechist Roxana Varas, with whom he has five children: Edmundo, Cristóbal, Sebastián, María de los Ángeles, and Ignacio.
