= Claudio Orrego =

Chilean politician (born 1966)

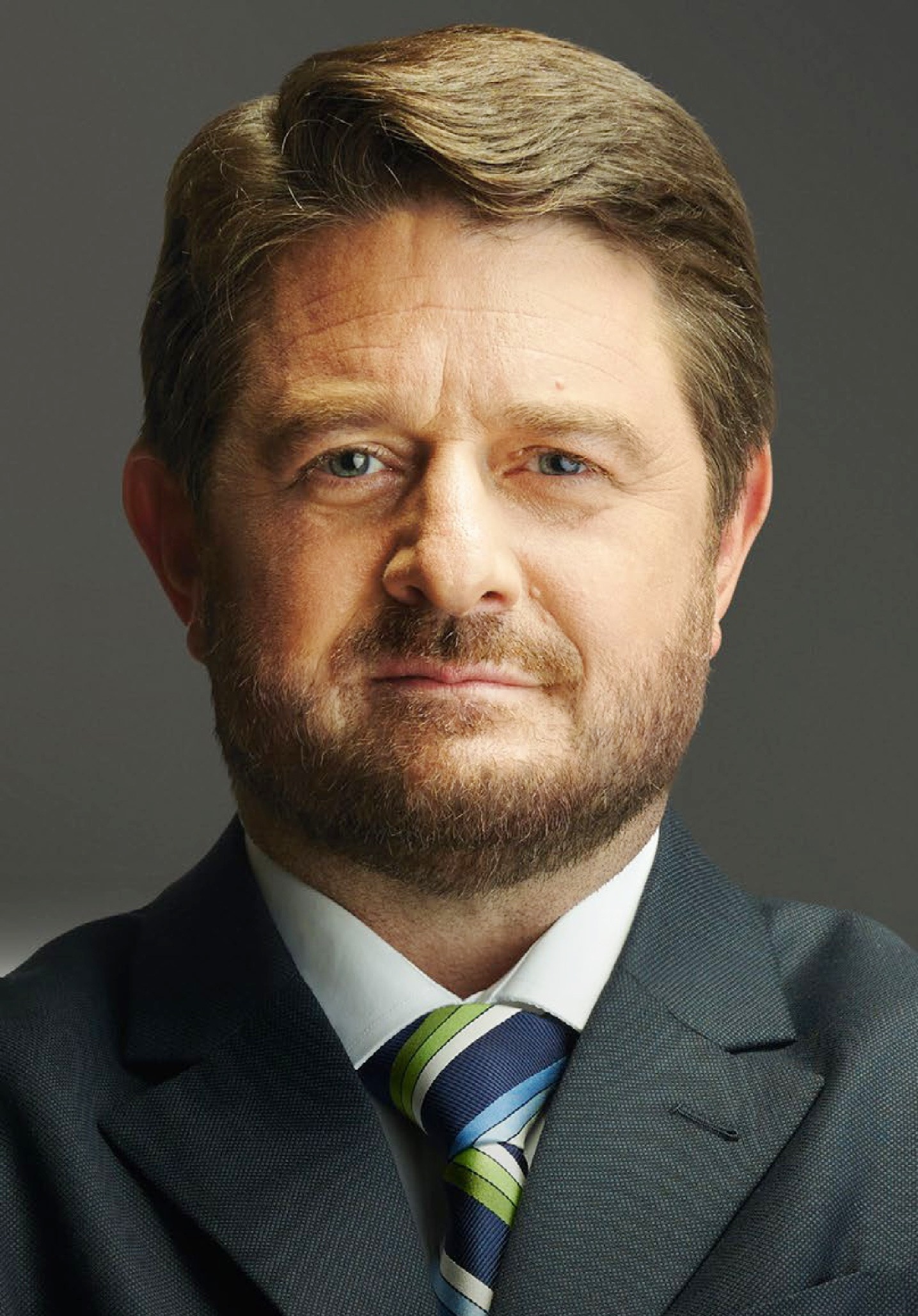

Governor of the Santiago Metropolitan Region
- Incumbent
- Assumed office 21 July 2021
- Preceded by: Office established

Intendant of Santiago Metropolitan Region
- In office 11 March 2014 – 11 March 2018
- Preceded by: Juan Antonio Peribonio
- Succeeded by: Karla Rubilar

Mayor of Peñalolén
- In office 6 December 2004 – 6 December 2012
- Preceded by: Carlos Alarcón Castro
- Succeeded by: Carolina Leitao

Minister of Housing and Urban Development
- In office 11 March 2000 – 29 December 2000
- President: Ricardo Lagos
- Preceded by: Sergio Henríquez
- Succeeded by: Jaime Ravinet

Minister of National Assets
- In office 11 March 2000 – 29 December 2000
- President: Ricardo Lagos
- Preceded by: Sergio Galilea
- Succeeded by: Jaime Ravinet

Personal details
- Born: Claudio Benjamín Orrego Larraín; 20 December 1966 (age 59) Santiago, Chile
- Party: Christian Democratic Party
- Spouse: Francisca Morales
- Children: Four
- Parent: Claudio Orrego Vicuña
- Education: Pontifical Catholic University of Chile (LL.B); Harvard University (LL.M)
- Occupation: Politician
- Profession: Lawyer

Claudio Benjamín Orrego Larraín (born December 20, 1966) is a Chilean lawyer, Christian Democrat politician, and the Governor of the Santiago Metropolitan Region since July 14, 2021.

Orrego is a former minister of President Ricardo Lagos and the former mayor of the commune of Peñalolén. In 2013, he was a candidate for the presidency of Chile, but lost the primary election to Michelle Bachelet, and other candidates. On March 11, 2014, he was appointed intendant of the Santiago Metropolitan Region by President Bachelet.

On June 13, 2021, he was elected governor of the Santiago Metropolitan Region, in a newly created position, and was reelected in 2024.

== Family and education ==
He is the son of Christian Democratic politician Claudio Orrego Vicuña and Valentina Larraín Bunster, personal secretary to former President of the Republic Patricio Aylwin. He is also the great-great-grandson of politician Benjamín Vicuña Mackenna.

He completed his schooling at Saint George's College in Santiago, where he received the "Best Georgian" award for the class of 1984. He earned a law degree from the Pontificia Universidad Católica de Chile, where he served as president of the Student Federation (FEUC), and later obtained a master's degree in public policy from Harvard University in the United States.

During the years of the military dictatorship of Augusto Pinochet, he participated in the Movement against the torture, Sebastián Acevedo.

He was married to Francisca Morales, with whom he has four children.

== Political career ==
=== Early years ===
Between 1996 and 2000 he served as a city councillor for Peñalolén.

On 11 March 2000 he assumed office as dual minister of Housing and Urbanism and National Assets under President Ricardo Lagos.

He served as vice president for business development at Sonda from June 2001, a position he resigned from in order to run for mayor of Peñalolén in 2004. He won the election with 48.60% of the vote.

=== Mayor of Peñalolén ===
Among his most emblematic projects as mayor were the construction of three new primary healthcare centers of higher-than-usual standards, the end of the Nazur land occupation and the creation of a park on that site, a new police station in the Lo Hermida sector, the cultural and sports center Chimkowe, the installation of two innovative schools supported by the U.S.-based Microsoft, and the creation of a Municipal Housing Management Office to address the situation of thousands of overcrowded families.

In 2007, in an award ceremony organized by Radio Agricultura, he was chosen by his peers, together with Johnny Carrasco (mayor of Pudahuel), as the best mayor of the Santiago Metropolitan Region. He received the same distinction the following year in a vote coordinated by the newspaper La Segunda, which surveyed all members of Congress of Chile and six of the country's most prestigious public policy think tanks.

In the October 2008 municipal elections he was re-elected with 58.42% of the vote (46,419 votes). His party, however, suffered a significant electoral crisis that led to the resignation of its president, Senator Soledad Alvear. Orrego was mentioned as a possible successor to Deputy Jorge Burgos, who was serving as interim head of the party. However, his candidacy failed to gain traction, leaving the so-called Príncipes faction—comprising members such as Alberto Undurraga and Ignacio Walker—out of party leadership.

=== Presidential pre-candidacy ===
In March 2012, Orrego officially announced his intention to seek his party's nomination ahead of the 2013 Chilean presidential election.

He secured the nomination in January 2013 after defeating Senator Ximena Rincón in a nationwide primary election. On 13 April he was officially proclaimed his party's candidate for the 2013 Nueva Mayoría presidential primary held on 30 June.

In that primary he finished third among the four candidates of the Nueva Mayoría coalition, obtaining 8.86% (189,582 votes), behind Michelle Bachelet (73.05%) and independent candidate Andrés Velasco.

Following Bachelet's victory in the presidential election, he was appointed Intendant of the Santiago Metropolitan Region, a position he held from March 2014 to March 2018.

=== Governor of the Santiago Metropolitan Region ===
In 2020 he launched his candidacy in the 2021 Santiago Metropolitan Region gubernatorial election, ultimately winning the office in a close runoff against Karina Oliva of the Broad Front. He assumed office on 14 July 2021, becoming the first elected governor of the Santiago Metropolitan Region.

In September 2022 he resigned from the Christian Democratic Party, in which he had been a member for more than thirty years.

In 2024 he gathered the required signatures to run as an independent candidate in the 2024 Chilean regional elections. He advanced to the runoff election against the Chile Vamos candidate Francisco Orrego.
