= Raúl Sohr =

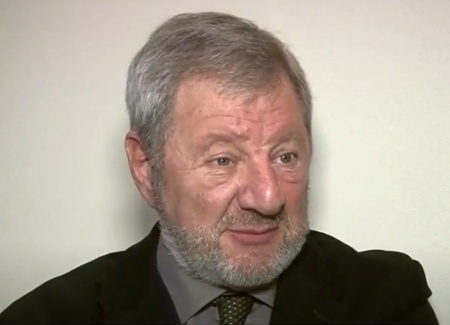
Raúl Sohr in 2014.

Raúl Sohr (born May 13, 1947, in Temuco) is a Chilean journalist, sociologist and international relations analyst. He studied at University of Chile, University of Paris, and earned a Ph.D. from the London School of Economics. At present he works at CNN Chile. He reported on the Falklands War in 1982. In the 1990s Sohr investigated the Pizarreño asbestos disaster while working for Televisión Nacional de Chile. According to ADN Radio Sohr's analyses were in heavy demand among social media users when the 2022 Russian invasion of Ukraine begun.
