= Asbestos Convention =

International Labour Organization Convention

C162
Asbestos Convention, 1986
- Parties to the convention
- Signed: 24 June 1986
- Location: Geneva
- Effective: 16 June 1989
- Condition: 2 ratifications
- Ratifiers: 35
- Depositary: Director-General of the International Labour Office
- Languages: French and English

Asbestos Convention, 1986 is an International Labour Organization Convention, adopted at the 72nd session of the International Labour Conference.

It was established in 1986, with the preamble stating:

Having decided upon the adoption of certain proposals with regard to safety in the use of asbestos,...

== Ratifications ==
As of 2023, the convention has been ratified by 35 states from all continents.

Country	Date	Status
Australia	10 Aug 2011	In Force
Belgium	11 Oct 1996	In Force
Bolivia	11 Jun 1990	In Force
Bosnia and Herzegovina	02 Jun 1993	In Force
Brazil	18 May 1990	In Force
Cameroon	20 Feb 1989	In Force
Canada	16 Jun 1988	In Force
Chile	14 Oct 1994	In Force
Colombia	25 Jan 2001	In Force
Croatia	08 Oct 1991	In Force
Cyprus	07 Aug 1992	In Force
Denmark	18 Dec 2006	In Force
Ecuador	11 Apr 1990	In Force
Finland	20 Jun 1988	In Force
Germany	18 Nov 1993	In Force
Guatemala	18 Apr 1989	In Force
Japan	11 Aug 2005	In Force
Kazakhstan	05 Apr 2011	In Force
Luxembourg	08 Apr 2008	In Force
Montenegro	03 Jun 2006	In Force
Morocco	13 Apr 2011	In Force
Netherlands	15 Sep 1999	In Force
North Macedonia	17 Nov 1991	In Force
Norway	04 Feb 1992	In Force
Portugal	3 May 1999	In Force
Republic of Korea	04 Apr 2007	In Force
Russian Federation	04 Sep 2000	In Force
Serbia	24 Nov 2000	In Force
Slovenia	29 May 1992	In Force
Spain	02 Aug 1990	In Force
Sweden	02 Sep 1987	In Force
Switzerland	16 Jun 1992	In Force
Uganda	27 Mar 1990	In Force
Uruguay	06 Sep 1995	In Force
Zimbabwe	09 Apr 2003	In Force
