= Asbestos law in the United States =

Law regarding the use of asbestos

Within the United States, the use of asbestos is limited by state and federal regulations and legislation. Improper use of asbestos and injury from exposure is addressed through administrative action, litigation, and criminal prosecution. Injury claims arising from asbestos exposure may be tried as mass torts.

== Civil litigation ==
Asbestos litigation is the longest, most expensive mass tort in U.S. history, involving more than 8,000 defendants and 700,000 claimants. By the early 1990s, "more than half of the 25 largest asbestos manufacturers in the US, including Amatex, Carey-Canada, Celotex, Eagle-Picher, Forty-Eight Insulations, Manville Corporation, National Gypsum, Standard Insulation, Unarco, and UNR Industries had declared bankruptcy. Analysts have estimated that the total costs of asbestos litigation in the U.S. alone will eventually reach $200 to $275 billion." The amounts and method of allocating compensation have been the source of many court cases, and government attempts at resolution of existing and future cases.

Claims made against employers by injured workers will typically be in the form of a workers compensation claim, although the long onset for diseases such as mesothelioma may make it impossible for a worker to pursue workers' compensation benefits. However, it is possible for an injured worker to also bring a product liability claim against a third party that is responsible for introducing asbestos into the workplace. Plaintiffs' attorneys have attempted to offer "every exposure" or "substantial factor" liability theories under which they do not need to prove defendants were the proximate cause of plaintiffs' injuries because no level of asbestos exposure is safe. This approach has been rejected by U.S. District Judge David C. Norton.

Asbestos lawsuits in the U.S. have included the following as defendants:

1. manufacturers of machinery that are alleged to have utilized asbestos-containing parts;
2. owners of premises at which asbestos-containing products were installed;
3. retailers of asbestos-containing products, including hardware, home improvement and automotive parts stores;
4. corporations that allegedly conspired with asbestos manufacturers to deliberately conceal the dangers of asbestos;
5. manufacturers of tools that were used to cut or shape asbestos-containing parts; and
6. manufacturers of respiratory protective equipment that allegedly failed to protect workers from asbestos exposure.

=== Common defenses ===
==== Third-party liability ====
Manufacturers of machinery in which asbestos-containing parts were used have contested liability on the grounds that nearly all of them either did not ship asbestos-containing parts with their products at all (that is, asbestos was installed only by end users) or did not sell replacement parts for their own products (in cases where the plaintiff was allegedly exposed well after any factory-original asbestos-containing parts would have been replaced), and either way cannot be responsible for toxic third-party parts that they did not manufacture, distribute, or sell. In 2008, the Washington Supreme Court, the first state supreme court to reach the issue, decided in favor of the defense. On January 12, 2012, the Supreme Court of California also decided in favor of the defense in O'Neil v. Crane Co.

==== Chrysotile vs. amphibole ====
Another area of dispute remains the so-called chrysotile-defense. Manufacturers of some products containing only chrysotile fibers claim that these are not as harmful as amphibole-containing products. As 95% of the products used in the United States historically were mostly chrysotile, this claim is widely disputed by health officials and medical professionals. The World Health Organization recognizes that exposure to all types of asbestos fibers, including chrysotile, can cause cancer of the lung, larynx, and ovary, mesothelioma, and asbestosis.

As of March 2024, the U.S. Environmental Protection Agency finalized regulations banning imports of chrysotile asbestos (effective immediately) due to its link to lung cancer and mesothelioma. However, the new rules can allow up to a dozen years to phase out the use of chrysotile asbestos in some manufacturing facilities. The long phase-out period was a result of a strong lobby by Olin Corporation, a major chemical manufacturer, as well as trade groups like the U.S. Chamber of Commerce and the American Chemistry Council. Chrysotile asbestos is now banned in more than 50 other countries.

==== Ethics ====
Defendants in asbestos litigation have accused the lawyers who represent plaintiffs of unethical conduct, but those allegations have not been successful in stopping the litigation, nor have courts been sufficiently convinced by the allegations to sanction the law firms against whom the allegations have been raised.

- Screening and solicitation: Defense firms allege that most lawsuits involving claims for non-malignant asbestos injuries are generated by asbestos screening companies, firms that are generally closely connected to trial lawyers but are run by people with no medical training. Some legal scholars suggest that because lawyers often find screening companies using union locals as intermediaries, the rule is not violated. Defendants also allege that plaintiffs obtain diagnoses from physicians who do not follow proper standards when testing patients.
- Excessive legal fees: Defendants have attempted to claim that contingency fees in asbestos cases are unreasonable because the cases may not involve much risk or effort on the part of the plaintiff's lawyer. However, these claims have proved unsuccessful.
- Product identification: As product identification is the most important part of preparing witnesses in asbestos cases, plaintiffs must demonstrate that they were exposed to enough asbestos for a long enough time derived from the product of a particular defendant in order to win their claim. Defendants have claimed that plaintiffs' lawyers manipulate their clients to identify solvent companies as suppliers instead of those that have filed for bankruptcy. No court has accepted this allegation.

=== Asbestos bankruptcy trusts ===
Since the bankruptcy filing of Johns-Manville in 1984, many U.S. and U.K. asbestos manufacturers have avoided litigation by filing bankruptcy. Asbestos bankruptcy trusts are personal injury trusts established by firms that have filed for reorganization under Chapter 11 of the United States Bankruptcy Code to pay personal injury claims caused by exposure to asbestos. At least fifty-six trusts were established from the mid-1970s through 2011. The largest 26 of these trusts paid about 2.4 million claims totaling about $10.9 billion up to 2008. The trusts are governed by trust advisory committees that are generally controlled by lawyers from a few prominent law firms such as Baron & Budd, P.C. and Weitz & Luxenberg P.C.

Bankruptcy trusts may pay pennies on the dollar to people injured as a result of asbestos exposure. At the same time, these trusts may permit larger numbers of claimants to receive some kind of compensation, even if greatly reduced from potential recoveries in the tort system.

==== Medicaid and Medicare reimbursement ====
The federal Medicare Secondary Payer law imposes penalties for paying settlements directly to claimants without repaying the government for medical costs covered under the same programs under the legal doctrine of subrogation. In late 2016, attorneys general from 13 states sent demand letters to bankruptcy trusts for Armstrong World Industries, Babcock & Wilcox, DII, and Owens Corning. The purpose of the demand letters was to determine if the funds are reimbursing states for medical treatment received under Medicaid and Medicare.

==== Bankruptcy trusts and litigated claims ====
The pursuit of compensation for asbestos injuries often involves both litigation against solvent defendants and filing claims against asbestos bankruptcy trusts.

The amount of compensation recovered by an injured plaintiff may depend on whether evidence of exposure to products from bankrupt firms is introduced at trial. If no evidence of exposure from bankrupt firms is presented then increased financial responsibility is likely to be assigned to solvent defendants. Researchers from RAND Corporation found that if a company filed for bankruptcy plaintiffs claimed exposure to their products in interrogatories and depositions at significantly reduced rates.

When a plaintiff claiming an asbestos injury has filed a claim against a solvent defendant, courts may extend or reopen discovery when it is discovered that the plaintiff failed to disclose a trust claims. For example, in the 2008 case of Edwards v. John Crane-Houdaille, Inc production of claim forms was delayed until two weeks before trial. In the 2004 case of Stoeckler v. American Oil Co. the defendants discovered that the plaintiff did not disclose trust claims only three days after the start of the trial, resulting in the re-opening of discovery. To help avoid this type of issue, Judges will often adopt mandatory disclosure obligations for bankruptcy trust claims.

== Regulation ==
According to a September 2004 of the American Journal of Respiratory and Critical Care Medicine, asbestos is still a hazard for 1.3 million US workers in the construction industry and for workers involved in the maintenance of buildings and equipment.

Asbestos is not part of an ASTM (American Society for Testing and Materials) E 1527-05 Phase I Environmental Site Assessment (ESA). A building survey for asbestos is considered an out-of-scope consideration under the industry standard ASTM 1527-05 Phase I ESA (see ASTM E 1527-05). ASTM Standard E 2356-04 should be consulted by the owner or owner's agent to determine which type of asbestos building survey is appropriate, typically either a baseline survey or a design survey of functional areas. Both types of surveys are explained in detail under ASTM Standard E 2356-04. Typically, a baseline survey is performed by an EPA (or state) licensed asbestos inspector. The baseline survey provides the buyer with sufficient information on presumed asbestos at the facility, often which leads to reduction in the assessed value of the building (due primarily to forthcoming abatement costs). Note: EPA NESHAP (National Emissions Standards for Hazardous Air Pollutants) and OSHA (Occupational Safety and Health Administration) Regulations must be consulted in addition to ASTM Standard E 2356-04 to ensure all statutory requirements are satisfied, ex. notification requirements for renovation/demolition. Asbestos is not a material covered under CERCLA (Comprehensive Environmental Response, Compensation, and Liability Act ) innocent purchaser defense. In some instances, the U.S. EPA includes asbestos contaminated facilities on the NPL (Superfund). Buyers should be careful not to purchase facilities, even with an ASTM E 1527-05 Phase I ESA completed, without a full understanding of all the hazards in a building or at a property, without evaluating non-scope ASTM E 1527-05 materials, such as asbestos, lead, PCBs, mercury, radon, et al. A standard ASTM E 1527-05 does not include asbestos surveys as standard practice.

=== Federal ===
In 1988, the United States Environmental Protection Agency (USEPA) issued regulations requiring certain U.S. companies to report the asbestos used in their products.

A Senate subcommittee of the Health Education Labor and Pensions Committee heard testimony on July 31, 2001, regarding the health effects of asbestos. Members of the public, doctors, and scientists called for the United States to join other countries in a ban on the product.

Several legislative remedies have been considered by the U.S. Congress but each time rejected for a variety of reasons. In 2005, Congress considered but did not pass legislation entitled the "Fairness in Asbestos Injury Resolution Act of 2005". The act would have established a $140 billion trust fund in lieu of litigation, but as it would have proactively taken funds held in reserve by bankruptcy trusts, manufacturers and insurance companies, it was not widely supported either by victims or corporations.

On April 26, 2005, Philip J. Landrigan, professor and chair of the Department of Community and Preventive Medicine at Mount Sinai Medical Center in New York City, testified before the US Senate Committee on the Judiciary against this proposed legislation. He testified that many of the bill's provisions were unsupported by medicine and would unfairly exclude a large number of people who had become ill or died from asbestos: "The approach to the diagnosis of disease caused by asbestos that is set forth in this bill is not consistent with the diagnostic criteria established by the American Thoracic Society. If the bill is to deliver on its promise of fairness, these criteria will need to be revised." Also opposing the bill were the American Public Health Association and the Asbestos Workers' Union.

On June 14, 2006, the Senate Judiciary Committee approved an amendment to the act which would have allowed victims of mesothelioma $1.1M within 30 days of their claim's approval. This version would have also expanded eligible claimants to people exposed to asbestos from the September 11, 2001 attacks on the World Trade Center, and to construction debris in hurricanes Katrina and Rita. Ultimately, the bill's reliance on funding from private entities large and small, as well as debate over a sunset provision and the impact on the U.S. budgetary process caused the bill to fail to leave committee. The Environmental Protection Agency (EPA) has no general ban on the use of asbestos. However, asbestos was one of the first hazardous air pollutants regulated under Section 112 of the Clean Air Act of 1970, and many applications have been forbidden by the Toxic Substances Control Act (TSCA).

=== State ===
In 2010, Washington passed a ban on hazardous materials in automotive brakes, phasing out asbestos in vehicle brakes, starting in 2014.

In 2013, Ohio passed became the first state to pass a law requiring transparency in asbestos bankruptcy trust claims. The same year Oklahoma passed a similar law called The Personal Injury Trust Fund Transparency Act. This law applies to all personal injury trusts. It requires plaintiffs to disclose all previously filed and anticipated trust claims for personal injuries within 90 days of filing a personal injury tort but not until at least 180 days before the assigned court date. If the plaintiff anticipates filing a trust claim all proceedings are stayed until their filing is complete. Filing new claims or amending claims after the initial disclosure triggers a new disclosure requirement. The law also allows defendants to stay proceedings by showing that the plaintiff could make a good faith filing with a trust. The law gives plaintiffs ten days to either file such a claim or show that it would probably be unsuccessful.

In South Carolina in 2015, State Senator Shane Massey introduced Senate Bill 281, "The Court Transparency Act." S.281 would prohibit the state of South Carolina from hiring outside lawyers. Similar bills have been passed into law by 18 states. The bill would also prevent juries from awarding damages that exceed actual out of pocket costs incurred by plaintiffs.

In June 2015, Texas Governor Greg Abbott signed Texas House Bill 1492 into law. The law was written to end so-called asbestos "double dipping" in Texas. This law requires asbestos victims to perform more actions before proceeding to trial, and lowers the standard of proof of asbestos exposure for manufacturers to shift the blame onto other bankrupt companies. A year earlier, Wisconsin Governor Scott Walker signed a similar bill into law.

In June 2016, President Obama signed into law the Frank R. Lautenburg Chemical Safety for the 21st Century Act (H.R. 2576). It serves to reform the TSCA of 1976 and aims to make federal safety regulations on toxic substances and chemicals effective.

In 2017, Iowa, Mississippi, North Dakota, and South Dakota all passed asbestos trust claims transparency laws.

== Abatement ==
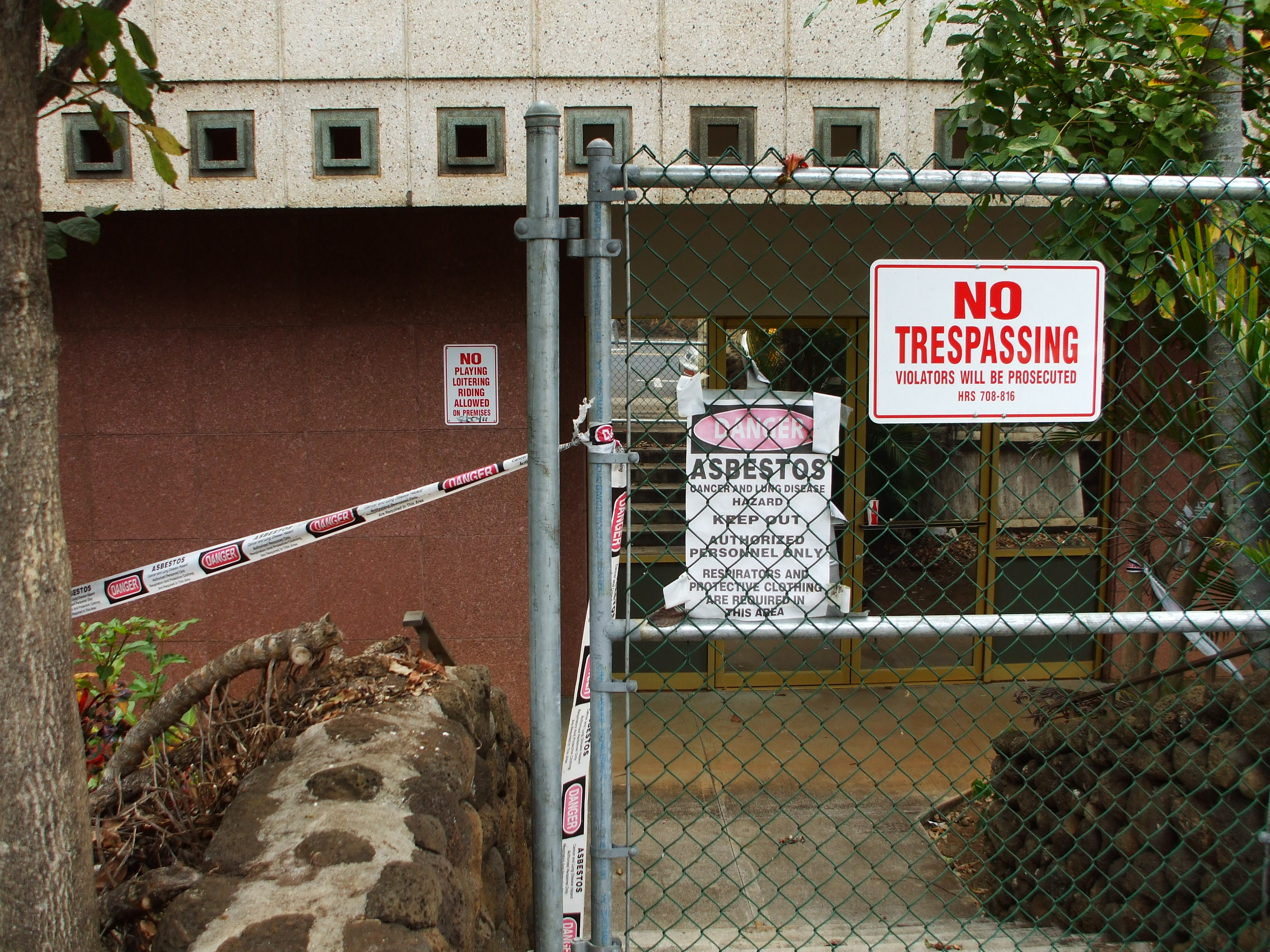
Old Wailuku Post Office sealed off for asbestos removal

Asbestos abatement (removal of asbestos) has become a thriving industry in the United States. Strict removal and disposal laws have been enacted to protect the public from airborne asbestos. The Clean Air Act requires that asbestos be wetted during removal and strictly contained, and that workers wear safety gear and masks. The federal government has prosecuted dozens of violations of the act and violations of Racketeer Influenced and Corrupt Organizations Act (RICO) related to the operations. Often these involve contractors who hire undocumented workers without proper training or protection to illegally remove asbestos.

W. R. Grace and Company faces fines of up to $280 million for polluting the town of Libby, Montana. Libby was declared a Superfund disaster area in 2002, and the EPA has spent $54 million in cleanup. Grace was ordered by a court to reimburse the EPA for cleanup costs, but the bankruptcy court must approve any payments.

== Notable cases ==
=== Civil ===
The U.S. Supreme Court has dealt with several asbestos-related cases since 1986. Two large class action settlements, designed to limit liability, came before the court in 1997 and 1999. Both settlements were ultimately rejected by the court because they would exclude future claimants, or those who later developed asbestos-related illnesses. These rulings addressed the 20-50 year latency period of serious asbestos-related illnesses.

==== Borel v. Fibreboard Corp. ====
In this case a federal appeals court ruled that an insulation installer from Texas could sue asbestos manufactures for failure to warn. Borel's lawyers argued that had warning labels been affixed to Fiberboard's products he would have been able to protect himself more effectively.

==== Manville ====
The Manville Corporation, formerly the Johns-Manville Corporation, filed for reorganization and protection under the United States Bankruptcy Code in August 1982. At the time, it was the largest company ever to file bankruptcy, and was one of the richest. Manville was then 181st on the Fortune 500, but was the defendant of 16,500 lawsuits related to the health effects of asbestos. The company was described by Ron Motley, a South Carolina attorney, as "the greatest corporate mass murderer in history." Court documents show that the corporation had a long history of hiding evidence of the ill effects of asbestos from its workers and the public.

==== Garlock ====
In a decision from January 2014, Gray v. Garlock Sealing Technologies had entered into bankruptcy proceedings, and discovery in the case uncovered evidence of fraud that led to a reduction in estimated future liability to a tenth of what was estimated.

==== RICO cases ====
A number of lawsuits have been filed under the Racketeer Influenced and Corrupt Organizations Act (RICO) in response to what defendants claim to be fraudulent asbestos-related lawsuits. RICO suits are civil in nature and brought by private parties. They typically allege that the suits themselves are forms of racketeering or that lawyers and experts had to engage in racketeering activities in order to bring them.

For example,

- in 2012 a lawsuit was filed by CSX Transportation Inc. alleging that lawyers and a doctor who represented plaintiffs in asbestos cases had engaged in acts of civil racketeering in their pursuit of fraudulent claims, resulting in a verdict in favor of CSX Transportation. The lawsuit was later settled on appeal, leaving in place the civil racketeering verdict in favor of CSX Transportation.
- In 2014, attorneys for Garlock Sealing Technologies, LLC, filed a lawsuit against four asbestos litigation firms, alleging civil racketeering. In March 2016 Garlock, and its parent company EnPro, entered into a settlement that involved the dismissal of their racketeering claims and the payment of $480 million to settle related asbestos injury claims.
- In 2016, John Crane Group filed lawsuits against Simon Greenstone Panatier and Shein Law Center in federal court, alleging that the defendant law firms withheld evidence in violation of the RICO Act. One of the defendant law firms has filed a motion to dismiss the claims.

=== Criminal ===
Some companies and their executives have faced criminal prosecution for their actions in exposing workers to the dangers of asbestos, or their improper handling of asbestos waste.

==== Adamo Wrecking Company ====
On February 20, 1973 a federal grand jury in Detroit, Michigan indicted Adamo Wrecking Company ("Adamo") for violating provisions of the Clean Air Act by knowingly causing the emission of asbestos by failure to wet and remove friable asbestos materials from demolitions.

Adamo was one of a number of demolition contractors indicted throughout the country for the alleged violation of the Clean Air Act. The United States District Court for the Eastern District of Michigan dismissed the criminal indictment on the ground that it was not an "emission standard," but a "work practice standard," which under the terms of the statute, did not carry criminal liability.

The government appealed and the Sixth Circuit Court of Appeals reversed the decision of the trial court, stating that it erred in determining that it had jurisdiction to review the validity of the standard in a criminal proceeding. Adamo's attorneys appealed to the Supreme Court.

On January 10, 1978, the Supreme Court ruled in favor of Adamo when it held that the trial court did have jurisdiction to review the standard in a criminal proceeding and also agreed with the trial court that the requirements in the act were "not standards" but "procedures" and therefore the proceedings were properly dismissed.

==== W. R. Grace and Company ====
A federal grand jury indicted W. R. Grace and Company and seven top executives on February 5, 2005, for its operations of a vermiculite mine in Libby, Montana. The indictment accused Grace of wire fraud, knowing endangerment of residents by concealing air monitoring results, obstruction of justice by interfering with an Environmental Protection Agency (EPA) investigation, violation of the Clean Air Act, providing asbestos materials to schools and local residents, and conspiracy to release asbestos and cover up health problems from asbestos contamination. The Department of Justice said 1,200 residents had developed asbestos-related diseases and some had died, and there could be many more injuries and deaths.

On June 8, 2006, a federal judge dismissed the conspiracy charge of "knowing endangerment" because some of the defendant officials had left the company before the five-year statute of limitations had begun to run. The wire fraud charge was dropped by prosecutors in March.

==== Other prosecutions ====
On April 2, 1998, three men were indicted in a conspiracy to use homeless men for illegal asbestos removal from an aging Wisconsin manufacturing plant. Then-US Attorney General Janet Reno said, "Knowingly removing asbestos improperly is criminal. Exploiting the homeless to do this work is cruel."

On December 12, 2004, owners of New York asbestos abatement companies were sentenced to the longest federal jail sentences for environmental crimes in U.S. history, after they were convicted on 18 counts of conspiracy to violate the Clean Air Act and the Toxic Substances Control Act, and actual violations of the Clean Air Act and Racketeer-Influenced and Corrupt Organizations Act. The crimes involved a 10-year scheme to illegally remove asbestos. The RICO counts included obstruction of justice, money laundering, mail fraud and bid rigging, all related to the asbestos cleanup.

On January 11, 2006, San Diego Gas & Electric Co., two of its employees, and a contractor were indicted by a federal grand jury on charges that they violated safety standards while removing asbestos from pipes in Lemon Grove, California. The defendants were charged with five counts of conspiracy, violating asbestos work practice standards and making false statements.

== Public reception ==
Asbestos law came to wider attention in the United States due to incessant advertisements of mass torts on television, leading to the subject being treated with a greater amount of levity than some might desire.
