= In re Garlock Sealing Technologies, LLC =

U.S. District Court Case

In Re: Garlock Sealing Technologies, LLC
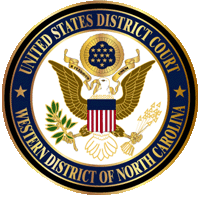
- Court: United States District Court for the Western District of North Carolina
- Full case name: In Re: Garlock Sealing Technologies, LLC, et al.
- Decided: January 10, 2014

Holding
- Controversial bankruptcy court decision that reduced Garlock's total liability (for past and future victims) in mesothelioma related lawsuits from $1.25 billion to $125 million.

Court membership
- Judge sitting: Judge George Hodges

In re Garlock Sealing Technologies, LLC is a court case heard in the United States District Court for the Western District of North Carolina which involves the entry into bankruptcy proceedings by Garlock Sealing Technologies, once a manufacturer of coated asbestos gaskets, as a result of potential liability from current and future settlements. The plaintiffs were over 4,000 asbestos victims suffering from mesothelioma, including many Navy veterans, as well as an unknown number of future mesothelioma victims. As noted by the court, mesothelioma "is always fatal, causing death essentially by suffocation within about eighteen months of diagnosis" and involves "a horrific death."

In March 2016 Garlock, and its parent company Enpro Industries, settled with plaintiffs for $480 million.

== Background ==
Garlock is a large manufacturer of gaskets that once contained chrysotile asbestos. Garlock stamps its name prominently on its products making it famous among the workers who install and replace its gaskets. Garlock's gaskets were installed in pipes, valves, and flanges which were in turn covered in heavy fire-retardant insulation that also contained asbestos but was manufactured by other parties. The asbestos contained by Garlock products is encased in a polymer-like substance. Garlock products only emitted asbestos fibers when cut or struck heavily, usually during removal. Removing such gaskets would necessarily require first removing the insulation covering them which would also release asbestos. The chrysotile asbestos previously used in Garlock's gaskets is roughly 1/100 to 1/2000 as carcinogenic as the friable amphibole asbestos used in the insulating tape just mentioned. Over a thirty-five year period Garlock was sued hundreds of thousands of times and forced to pay about $1.3 billion in judgements, settlements, and defense costs. Garlock exhausted its insurance coverage in 2010.

== Case history ==
In 2010, Garlock filed under a special section of the bankruptcy code (Chapter 11, section 524(g)), which Congress enacted in 1994 because many asbestos companies were facing the prospect of bankruptcy due to the number of victims. Beginning in the 1930s, the asbestos industry engaged in a cover-up of the lethal effects of asbestos that went on for decades. The product, which has not been banned in the United States, still kills over 3,000 people a year, according to the Centers for Disease Control and Prevention. The special bankruptcy law allows a company to set aside money in a trust to compensate - to a limited extent - its victims, while staying operational and profitable. Filing under 524(g) allows most asbestos corporations to remain economically healthy, although trusts typically lack sufficient funds to fully pay every claim. The median payment percentage to an asbestos victim is 25 percent of a claim's value. Garlock's bankruptcy filing came after it exhausted its insurance due to about thirty years of asbestos-related litigation.

After filing under section 524(g) of the U.S. Bankruptcy Code in 2010, Garlock sought to limit its liability to current and future mesothelioma-related cases. The approach used by the court for calculating liability was put forth by Garlock's expert, Charles Bates, co-founder of the industry-consulting firm. Benjamin N. Cardozo School of Law professor Lester Brickman was retained by counsel for Garlock to write an expert report describing the methods used by plaintiff law firms to arrive at inflated values for present and future claims.

The court decided to value Garlock's responsibility by "divorcing" it from Garlock's long history settling cases and the substantial jury verdicts against it. The company "contended that it was manipulated into overpaying in settlements with plaintiffs lawyers who withheld evidence that their clients were exposed to other manufacturers' products." The judge then ordered discovery on 15 cases, held a hearing and concluded that attorneys for the asbestos victims "withheld evidence that their clients were exposed to asbestos products from other companies."

Garlock's theory of its liability depended upon an analysis of the merits of the claims brought against it. The plaintiffs theory of liability was based on an extrapolation of Garlock's history of settling asbestos-related claims.

The lawyers for Garlock asked the judge for permission to investigate several other similar cases, and provided proof to the court that there was a pattern emerging of "withholding evidence" in mesothelioma cases. After discovery action of fifteen previously filed cases by plaintiffs against Garlock, Judge Hodges issued an opinion in his ruling that stated: "The last ten years of its participation in the tort system was infected by the manipulation of exposure evidence by plaintiffs and their lawyers. That tactic, though not uniform, had a profound impact on a number of Garlock's trials and many of its settlements such that the amounts recovered were inflated." The controversial decision by Judge George Hodges limited the total liability in mesothelioma-related lawsuits of Garlock to $125 million rather than a lower court's estimate of $1.25 billion, a reduction of approximately 90 percent.

The plaintiffs strongly challenged this finding and moved to "re-open the hearing on Garlock's liability," based on new evidence that Garlock was in possession of this evidence and indeed had been for decades, but hid this from the court and "presented false testimony at the estimation hearing."

In mid-October 2014, U.S. Bankruptcy Judge George Hodges ruled that all evidence supporting his decision to seal information in the case be unsealed as part of a broader examination of potential fraud in the case. However, Garlock continues to resist disclosing documents showing why the company settled its earlier cases. Plaintiffs are seeking to compel Garlock to release this information, which Garlock says led to inflated settlements but the plaintiffs say were reached due to significant evidence of Garlock's liability.

In January 2015, Garlock agreed to pay $358 million over 40 years to settle all future (not current) asbestos-related injury claims, but in March 2016 both sides settled the case. Garlock agreed to pay $480 million to all current and future asbestos victims who may have a claim against them.

=== Civil RICO suit ===
In January 2014, Garlock attorneys filed suit against four prominent asbestos law firms for conspiracy, fraud and violations of the Racketeer Influenced and Corrupt Organizations Act (RICO); only the first page of the complaints were filed publicly, with the remainder filed under seal to protect confidential information about previous asbestos lawsuits. Since then, several other mesothelioma cases have used this opinion to alter or beg reconsideration for discovery in civil tort action. The firms also strongly contest these allegations and at least one firm is currently embroiled in litigation over broad discovery requests.

Throughout 2014, the court case evolved in several directions at the same time. Defendants in the RICO case moved to have that case moved to the state of New York, stating that "Indeed, virtually all of the conduct alleged in the complaint occurred in New York, and not a single allegation concerns any events in North Carolina," According to an article in Legal Newsline, "The defendants deny the assertions in the lawsuit and believe critical evidence to prove their allegations include documents including at least three New York law firms – meaning the necessary evidence is located in New York." As the civil RICO act case heated up, more legal scholars began to follow the case and its far reaching implications for tort liability. Additionally, the U.S. Department of Justice filed an opinion in the case saying that Garlock's use of the 2019 filing procedure was correct, and Judge Hodges granting of disclosure of that information also correct, the judge erred in granting further access, and asked that his decision be reversed.

In March 2016, Garlock voluntarily dropped the RICO claims against Plaintiffs' attorneys and a federal judge agreed to stay the cases. As part of the greater settlement package the action will be dismissed with prejudice.

=== John Crane ===
John Crane Group filed to intervene but its petition was denied. John Crane Group then filed lawsuits against Simon Greenstone Panatier and Shein Law Center in 2016 in federal court in Illinois. The suit alleged that Shein withheld evidence in violation of the RICO Act in cases brought against John Crane by sufferers of mesothelioma. Specifically, the suits allege that the law firms failed to disclose during discovery that their clients had been exposed to products containing asbestos made by other companies and intentionally delayed filing claims against those companies' bankruptcy trusts. John Crane said that it would have avoided judgements and "substantial defense costs" if it had known this information.

== Congressional bills ==
In January 2015, Texas Representative Blake Farenthold introduced legislation called "Furthering Asbestos Claims Transparency Act (FACT) Act of 2015." The bill would, among other things, require asbestos trusts in the United States to file quarterly reports about the payouts they make and personal information on the victims who receive them in a publicly accessible database. The bill passed out of committee in May 2015 and is awaiting a full vote by the House of Representatives. In 2015, Senators Richard Durbin (D-IL) and Ed Markey (D-MA) introduced the "Reducing Exposure to Asbestos Database Act of 2015," which would establish a public database about the location and identity of asbestos and asbestos-containing products in the United States.

== Industry reaction ==
In mesothelioma cases in other states, this decision has opened the door to "Rule 2019 Filings" disclosure, and several companies are now seeing confidential records of previously settled suits to see if plaintiffs or legal counsel are involved in further cases of "double dipping." This has reversed a trend started in the early 2000s wherein asbestos lawyers had convinced judges to seal filings that would otherwise have been made public, under the rationale that they contained "commercial information."

== See also ==
- Asbestosis
- Mesothelioma
- Asbestos and the law
