= Garlock =

Garlock may refer to:

== People with the surname ==
- Dorothy Garlock (1919–2018), author
- Lyle S. Garlock, Assistant Secretary of the Air Force (Financial Management & Comptroller) from 1954 to 1961
- Ryan Garlock (born 1986), professional hockey player

== Other uses ==
- Garlock, California
- Garlock Sealing Technologies, a subsidiary of EnPro Industries
- Garlock Fault, fault running along the north margins of the Mojave Desert
