= Stemco =

- Company type: Subsidiary
- Industry: Manufacturing; Transportation
- Founded: 1951
- Headquarters: Longview, Texas, United States
- Key people: Eric Vaillancourt(President)
- Products: wheel end products suspension products brake products intelligent transportation systems
- Number of employees: 826
- Parent: EnPro Industries (NYSE: NPO)
- Website: www.stemco.com

Stemco (from "Specialized Truck Equipment Manufacturing Company") is a Longview, Texas, based company that manufactures and distributes products for the global commercial vehicle market. Its major product categories include wheel end products, brake products, intelligent transportation systems and suspension components.

== History ==
Stemco was founded on March 1, 1951, by Ben Cook and Tom Davidson in St. Charles, Missouri, and originally manufactured mufflers and oil reservoirs for commercial trucks. The company moved to Longview, Texas, in 1958 to expand the company and began manufacturing new truck parts, including dual wheel adapters, hub hose carriers, drum check gauges and exhaust accessories. This move led to an increase in production and employee growth. In 1964, Stemco was purchased by Garlock Inc, an industrial sealing company.

In the following decades, Stemco began designing and manufacturing new products for use in the commercial trucking industry, such as hub oil seals, hubodometers and other products which have become standard additions to OEM truck component manufacturers.

In 2007, Stemco began acquiring and partnering with other trucking equipment manufacturers. Stemco acquired V.W. Kaiser Engineering in 2008 to form Stemco Kaiser, Rome Tool and Die Co. in 2011 to form Stemco Rome and Motor Wheel Commercial Vehicle Systems in 2012 to form Stemco Motor Wheel. Partners and strategic allies include Duroline, BatRF, GAFF International and Crewson.

In July 2015, EnPro Industries, Inc. (NYSE:NPO), parent company to Stemco, completed its acquisition of the Veyance North American air springs business from Continental AG.

The air springs business unit is the manufacturer of Goodyear air springs that are used in suspension systems, cabs and seats of commercial vehicles. Previously part of Veyance Technologies, Inc., which Continental AG acquired in January 2015, the business is now part of EnPro's Stemco division.

The addition of the air springs business unit significantly expanded Stemco's presence and scale in the commercial vehicle suspension market and brought a workforce of approximately 530 employees.

In August 2020, Stemco sold the Stemco Motor Wheel brake drum and Crewson brake adjuster brands to Hendrickson International.

== Innovations ==
Stemco manufactures trucking products designed to improve vehicle safety and reduce maintenance needs, including intelligent drive systems, such as Aeris by Stemco, an automatic tire inflation system. Crewson, a brake component manufacturer, partners with Stemco to manufacture and distribute an automatic brake adjuster.

Other innovations include BatRF, a radio frequency product that monitors trucks and keeps detailed records of travel, distance, tire pressure, maintenance needs and other statistics useful to fleet managers. Stemco has also introduced DataTrac, a mileage counting hub-mounted odometer system.

== Brands ==
- Aeris – Aeris by Stemco is an automated tire inflation system that simultaneously monitors tire pressure while reducing tread wear and alerts operators when tires are in need of maintenance or replacement.
- BatRF – BatRF is a data collection system for trucks designed to monitor important information, such as monitoring distance traveled, tire pressure, fuel levels and expenses, and vehicle condition or maintenance needs. Stemco distributes the BatRF system.
- Stemco Brake Products – Stemco Brake Products manufactures heavy-duty brake lining products in conjunction with Duroline and Crewson (sold in August 2020), two leading producers of brake products and system components. Major products include Stemco Motor Wheel brake drums (sold in August 2020) and Stemco Rome New Steel Shoes.
- Stemco Gaff – Stemco Gaff specializes in bushings, mounts, engine supports, torque rods and subcomponents for truck suspension systems.
- Stemco Kaiser – Stemco Kaiser tests and manufactures pins and bushings for kingpin, suspension kit and no-ream repair kit applications.
