= Lawsuit Abuse Reduction Act of 2013 =

- Long title: To amend Rule 11 of the Federal Rules of Civil Procedure to improve attorney accountability, and for other purposes.
- Announced in: the 113th United States Congress
- Sponsored by: Rep. Lamar Smith (R, TX-21)
- Number of co-sponsors: 6

Legislative history
- Introduced in the House as H.R. 2655 by Rep. Lamar Smith (R, TX-21) on July 11, 2013; Committee consideration by United States House Committee on the Judiciary, United States House Judiciary Subcommittee on the Constitution and Civil Justice

The Lawsuit Abuse Reduction Act of 2013 (H.R. 2655) is a bill that would amend Rule 11 of the Federal Rules of Civil Procedure to require courts to impose appropriate sanctions on attorneys, law firms, or parties who file frivolous lawsuits and to require them to compensate parties injured by such conduct. The compensation would cover the attorney fees and other lawsuit-related costs that the defendant in the frivolous lawsuit had to pay. The bill would also remove the provision of Rule 11 allowing attorneys or parties who file frivolous papers to avoid party-requested sanctions by withdrawing their lawsuits before 21 days have passed. The bill was introduced in the United States House of Representatives during the 113th United States Congress. On November 14, 2013 the bill passed the House, but was never passed by the Senate.

== Provisions of the bill ==
This summary is based largely on the summary provided by the Congressional Research Service, a public domain source.

The Lawsuit Abuse Reduction Act of 2013 would amend the sanctions provisions in Rule 11 of the Federal Rules of Civil Procedure to require the court to impose an appropriate sanction on any attorney, law firm, or party that has violated, or is responsible for the violation of, the rule with regard to representations to the court. The bill would require any sanction to compensate parties injured by the conduct in question.

The bill removes a provision that prohibits filing a motion for sanctions if the challenged paper, claim, defense, contention, or denial is withdrawn or appropriately corrected within 21 days after service or within another time the court sets.

The bill also authorizes the court to impose additional sanctions, including striking the pleadings, dismissing the suit, non-monetary directives, or penalty payments if warranted for effective deterrence.

== Congressional Budget Office report ==
This summary is based largely on the summary provided by the Congressional Budget Office, as ordered reported by the House Committee on the Judiciary on September 11, 2013. This is a public domain source.

H.R. 2655 would amend Rule 11 of the Federal Rules of Civil Procedure to require courts to impose appropriate sanctions on attorneys, law firms, or parties who file frivolous lawsuits and to require them to compensate parties injured by such conduct. Under current law, courts may, but are not required to, impose such sanctions.

Under the legislation, any monetary sanction imposed under Rule 11 would be paid by the parties to the suit. Thus, the Congressional Budget Office (CBO) estimated that implementing the bill would result in no significant impact on the federal budget. Enacting H.R. 2655 would not affect direct spending or revenues; therefore, pay-as-you-go procedures do not apply.

H.R. 2655 contains no intergovernmental or private-sector mandates as defined in the Unfunded Mandates Reform Act and would not affect the budgets of state, local, or tribal governments.

== Procedural history ==
The Lawsuit Abuse Reduction Act of 2013 was introduced on July 11, 2013 by Rep. Lamar Smith (R, TX-21). It was referred to the United States House Committee on the Judiciary and the United States House Judiciary Subcommittee on the Constitution and Civil Justice. The House Judiciary committee voted to report the bill on September 11, 2013 by a vote of 17-10. House Report 113-255 was released to accompany the bill on October 30, 2013. On November 8, 2013, House Majority Leader Eric Cantor announced that the bill would be considered during the week of November 11, 2013. The House was scheduled to work on this bill on November 14, 2013.

== Debate and discussion ==
Rep. Lamar Smith argued in favor of the bill and getting rid of the 21-day safe-harbor provision, stating that it would help end lawyers filing frivolous lawsuits when they have "everything to gain and nothing to lose" by doing so. Smith also said that "Lawyers can file meritless lawsuits, and defendants are faced with the choice of years of litigation, high court costs and attorneys' fees or a settlement," and called the practice "legalized extortion."

Republicans argue in favor of the bill as being needed to help protect companies from expensive and wasteful lawsuits. Democrats argued that the bill is unnecessary since judges already have the option of imposing sanctions.

== See also ==
- List of bills in the 113th United States Congress
- Attorneys in the United States
- Sanctions (law)
- Frivolous litigation
- Lawsuit Abuse Reduction Act of 2015
