= Perry Weitz =

American lawyer

Perry Weitz is an American attorney and partner at the Manhattan law firm Weitz & Luxenberg, which he co-founded in 1986. He is also a founding partner of Oak Row Equities, a Miami Florida-based real estate development company.

== Background ==
Weitz started the law firm with an asbestos lawsuit. He sued on behalf of 36 workers who became sick after working at the Brooklyn Navy Yard. His suit got his clients $75 million. Of that $75 million, approximately one-third went to Weitz & Luxenberg. The firm now makes 60 percent of its revenue from litigation related to asbestos cases.

== Asbestos litigation ==
Among the countless numbers of asbestos trust funds, seven of them paid $2.4 billion in claims in 2008. Those payments amounted to $600 million in legal fees for the lawyers representing the plaintiffs. Within the asbestos litigation system, advisory committees exist to advocate for payments for plaintiffs. The committees usually oppose advocates who would preserve trust fund resources for the future, rather than pay claims at present. Weitz served on six of these committees. The interests of current and future claimants clash; current claimants want their payment at full value and quickly, while future claimants want to preserve the trust assets until they can apply for their own compensation.

In a 2002 article by The New York Times, "A Surge in Asbestos Suits, Many by Healthy Plaintiffs," a law professor at Yeshiva University, Lester Brickman, said, "Sick people with legitimate claims represent a tiny fraction of the claims being brought." In response, Weitz was quoted in the article as saying, "Juries throughout the United States have said that these people deserve compensation . . . You really have to have faith in the jury system."

== Politics ==
Weitz is a director of the New York State Trial Lawyers Association. The association is "a heavy lobbying presence in Albany," according to The New York Times.

In 2010, Kathleen Rice, the Nassau County district attorney, ran for New York state attorney general. In 2009, Rice hired Weitz's son, Justin Weitz, as an assistant district attorney. In the 2010 election cycle, Weitz and his partner, along with three other attorneys at Weitz & Luxenberg, contributed a total of $236,698 to Rice's campaign.
