= Luxenberg =

Luxenberg is a German language surname, of Luxembourg origins. It may refer to:

- Christoph Luxenberg, pseudonym of an Islamic scholar
- Geoff Luxenberg (born 1983), American politician

== See also ==
- Steven Luxenberg, fictional character on the television series The Wire
- Weitz & Luxenberg P.C., New York law firm
