= Lawsuit Abuse Reduction Act of 2015 =

Legislation

- Long title: A bill that would amend Rule 11 of the Federal Rules of Civil Procedure to require judges to impose mandatory sanctions on attorneys, law firms, or parties who file frivolous "claims, defenses, and other legal contentions." The bill replaces the current rule, which allows judges' discretion to impose sanctions, and instead forces judges to impose mandatory sanctions prescribed by Congress.
- Acronyms (colloquial): LARA of 2015
- Announced in: the 114th United States Congress
- Sponsored by: Rep. Lamar Smith (R, TX-21), Sen. Chuck Grassley (R- IA)
- Number of co-sponsors: House- 5(R), 0(D), 0(I); Senate- 1(R)

Legislative history
- Introduced in the House and Senate as H.R. 758 S. 401 by Rep. Lamar Smith (R, TX-21), and Sen. Chuck Grassley (R- IA) on February 5, 2015; Committee consideration by United States House Committee on the Judiciary, United States House Judiciary Subcommittee on the Constitution and Civil Justice, Senate Committee on the Judiciary; Passed the US House of Representatives on September 17, 2015 (241-185)

The Lawsuit Abuse Reduction Act of 2015 (H.R. 758, S. 401) is legislation that amends Rule 11 of the Federal Rules of Civil Procedure to require judges to impose mandatory sanctions on attorneys, law firms, or parties who file frivolous "claims, defenses, and other legal contentions." The legislation replaces the current rule, which allows judges' discretion to impose sanctions, and instead forces judges to impose mandatory sanctions prescribed by Congress. It also removes the rule's safe harbor protection, which currently allows attorneys to correct their pleadings, claims or contentions within a 21-day period without fear of sanctions.

The bill was introduced in the United States House of Representatives and the United States Senate during the 114th United States Congress on February 5, 2015. In a 19-13 vote on May 13, the House Judiciary Committee passed the bill.

On September 17, 2015 the full United States House of Representatives passed the Lawsuit Abuse Reduction Act (LARA) of 2015 by a vote of 241-185.

== Provisions ==
The legislation amends Rule 11 of the Federal Rules of Civil Procedure to:

- Require judges to impose mandatory sanctions on any attorney, law firm, or party that has violated, or is responsible for the violation of, the rule with regard to representations to the court. The bill would substitute the word "may" with the word "shall," forcing judges to levy mandatory minimum punishments. Current law allows judges to evaluate the specific situation and order appropriate remedies. As a result of the legislation, judges will no longer have the discretion in imposing these penalties.
- Remove current protections (from fear of sanctions) for a party who withdraws or corrects the challenged paper, claim, defense, contention, or denial within 21 days after service or within another time the court sets.
- Require judges to impose mandatory minimum punishments on any party who is sanctioned, without regard to the particular circumstances of the case. This includes, but is not limited to, attorney fees and costs. The bill also authorizes the court to impose additional sanctions, including striking the pleadings, dismissing the suit, nonmonetary directives, or penalty payments if warranted for effective deterrence.

== Procedural history ==
The Lawsuit Abuse Reduction Act of 2015 was introduced in the U.S. House of Representatives on February 5, 2015 by Rep. Lamar Smith (R, TX-21). It was subsequently referred to the United States House Committee on the Judiciary and the United States House Judiciary Subcommittee on the Constitution and Civil Justice. An identical bill was introduced in the Senate on the same day by Sen. Chuck Grassley (R- IA) and referred to the Senate Committee on the Judiciary.

H.R. 758 and S. 401 bypass the normal Federal Rules of Civil Procedure rule-making process, which is regulated by the Judicial Conference of the United States (the principal policy-making body of U.S. Courts), and alters the FRCP through congressional legislation. On April 13, the Judicial Conference of the United States Advisory Committee on Civil Rules sent a letter to Congress opposing H.R. 758 (LARA 2015) legislation.

The United States House Committee on the Judiciary began to mark-up the bill on April 15, 2015, but mark-up was not completed due to time constraints. The mark-up was rescheduled for May 13, 2015 and the bill was subsequently passed out of committee.

The bill was passed by the U.S. House of Representatives on September 17, 2015.

== Similarity to repealed 1983 rule ==
Portions of H.R. 758 are similar in language to a Federal Rule that was introduced in 1983, but repealed with modifications in 1993 after widespread problems and substantial criticism. Professor Lonny Hoffman of the University of Houston Law Center testified before the Subcommittee on the Constitution and Civil Justice in 2011 to explain, "there is a remarkable degree of agreement among judges, lawyers, legal scholars and litigants across the political spectrum that the 1983 amendment of Rule 11 was one of the most ill-advised procedural experiments ever tried." Professor Hoffman testified that the rule produced "an avalanche of unwelcome satellite litigation" and that "civil rights and employment discrimination plaintiffs, in particular, were impacted the most severely" with these cases being subject to sanction motions "more than 28% of the time, well out of proportion to the percentage of such cases filed."

Similar versions of this legislation have been introduced in previous congressional sessions, but were not passed.

== Support and opposition ==
The legislation is supported by the U.S. Chamber of Commerce, which believes mandatory sanctions will help curb unjustified lawsuits and has publicly applauded its passage by the United House of Representatives. Lamar Smith, of Texas is the primary sponsor of the legislation.

This legislation is opposed by the Judicial Conference of the United States, the American Bar Association, and a number of consumer rights organizations, including the Alliance for Justice, the Center for Justice & Democracy and Public Citizen. In a group letter to Congress, the organizations expressed concern that the changes would "burden an understaffed judiciary, prolong expensive litigation, and unfairly penalize consumers and employees as participants in civil lawsuits." Opposition to this legislation has been consistent through each yearly introduction of this bill.

In 2005, the Federal Judicial Center conducted a survey of federal trial judges to study how Rule 11 was operating. They found that 91% of judges surveyed opposed mandatory sanctions provisions in Rule 11. 86% supported current safe harbor provisions that protect an attorney who corrects their filings within 21 days. Only 16% believed that awarding attorney fees and other costs should be mandatory.

On September 17, 2015 the American Bar Association sent a letter to Congress opposing this legislation. They explained "Even though on the surface the legislation may seem straightforward and appealing, a thorough examination of the issue provides compelling evidence that, rather than reducing frivolous lawsuits, H.R. 758 will encourage civil litigation abuse and increase court costs and delays." The bill was passed later the same day.

== See also ==
- List of bills in the 114th United States Congress
- Attorneys in the United States
- Sanctions (law)
- Lawsuit
