= Hendrickson Holdings =

American holding company

Hendrickson logo

Hendrickson Holdings, L.L.C. is a privately held American holding company located in Woodridge, Illinois which, through its subsidiaries, designs and manufactures medium- and heavy-duty mechanical, elastomeric and air suspensions; integrated and non-integrated axle and brakes systems; tire pressure control systems; auxiliary lift axle systems; parabolic and multi-leaf springs; stabilizers; bumpers; and components to the global commercial transportation industry.

Hendrickson was founded by Magnus Hendrickson, a Swedish engineer who originally worked for Lauth-Juergens, in Ohio in 1913. Also in 1913, production was moved to Chicago, where Hendrickson manufactured trucks and truck parts. In 1926 Magnus' son, Robert Theodore Hendrickson I, developed the first tandem suspension, and from 1936, exclusively supplied this innovative type of suspension to International Harvester.

Hendrickson relocated to Lyons, Illinois in 1948, and expanded internationally by acquiring suspension companies in Europe, Canada, and South America. By the late 1970s, the company maintained more than nineteen points of presence worldwide.

Hendrickson was acquired in 1978 by The Boler Company, now its parent holding company. In 1985, the company sold the truck manufacturing portion of its business to concentrate on producing suspensions. As of 2022, it "presently has sales and distribution facilities and/or state-of-the-art manufacturing and research and development centers in the United States, Canada, Mexico, Colombia, United Kingdom, Germany, France, Austria, Romania, Poland, Turkey, India, China, Japan, Thailand, Australia and New Zealand.".

In August 2020, Hendrickson acquired the Stemco Motor Wheel brake drum and Crewson brake adjuster brands from Stemco.

== See also ==
- HME, Incorporated, the truck manufacturer
