= Enpro Industries =

American industrial technology company

Enpro
- Enpro Logo
- Company type: Public
- Traded as: NYSE: NPO; S&P 600 Component
- Industry: Industrial Technology
- Predecessor: Goodrich Corporation; Coltec Industries
- Founded: 2002
- Headquarters: Charlotte, North Carolina, United States
- Area served: Worldwide
- Key people: Eric Vaillancourt (Interim President and Chief Executive Officer)
- Number of employees: 4400
- Website: www.enpro.com

Enpro is a US-based industrial technology company that designs and manufactures products and materials for technology-intensive sectors. The company serves industries such as semiconductors, aerospace, power generation, heavy-duty trucking, agricultural machinery, chemical processing, pulp and paper, and life sciences from 61 primary manufacturing facilities located in 12 countries, worldwide. It is organized under three segments: Sealing Technologies, Advanced Surface Technologies, and Engineered Materials.

== History ==
On May 31, 2002, Goodrich Corporation (which later became part of UTC Aerospace Systems, which in turn was then folded into the Collins Aerospace subsidiary of Raytheon Technologies) spun off its Engineered Industrial Products business segment into a new company, named Enpro Industries, Incorporated. The spinoff consisted of businesses that were originally owned by Coltec Industries, which had been purchased by Goodrich in 1998. The businesses included in the spinoff were: Garlock Sealing Technologies, GGB, STEMCO, Fairbanks Morse Engine (which was sold in Q4-2019) and Quincy Compressor (which was sold to Atlas Copco in 2010). Asbestos liability was limited by complicated tax manipulation, of which Joseph Andolino was one of the architects.

=== Acquisitions ===
Since the formation of Enpro, the company has acquired a number of companies that are focused on engineered industrial products:

Sortable table
Company or Asset Acquired	Headquarters	Date	EnPro Business Unit	Products	Ref.
Pikotek Inc.	Lakewood, Colorado, United States	2003	Garlock Family of Companies (GPT)	Very Critical Service(VCS) Flange Insulation Gasket (application for high pressure, highly corrosive environments)	
Compressor Products International	Stafford, Texas, United States	2007	Compressor Products International	Compressor components and lubrication systems	
Technetics Corp	Columbia, South Carolina, United States	2009	Technetics Group	Metallic seals, metal bellows, plastomer and polytetrafluoroethylene (PTFE) seals and components, elastomeric seals	
Hydrodyne	Burbank, California, United States	2010	Technetics Group	Metallic seals and components for nuclear and aerospace applications	
Premier Lubrication Systems	Houston, Texas, United States	2010	Compressor Products International	Components, technical products and service for reciprocating compressors	
Progressive Equipment	Houston, Texas, United States	2010	Compressor Products International	Components, technical products and service for reciprocating compressors	
CC Technology	Midland, Texas, United States	2010	Compressor Products International	Lubrication systems and components for reciprocating compressors	
Tara Technologies	Daytona Beach, Florida, United States	2011	Technetics Group	Engineered products for the semiconductor, aerospace, energy and medical industries	
Rome Tool and Die	Rome, Georgia, United States	2011	STEMCO	Steel brake shoes	
Pipeline Seal and Insulator (PSI)	Houston, Texas, United States	2011	Garlock family of companies (GPT)	Pipeline sealing products	
Motorwheel Commercial Vehicle Systems	Livonia, Michigan, United States	2012	STEMCO	Braking system hubs, drums and rotors	
Fabrico, Inc	Oxford, Massachusetts, United States	2014	Technetics Group	Land-based Turbines	
Rubber Fab Gasket & Molding, Inc	Sparta, New Jersey, United States	2016	Garlock Family of Companies (GHT)	Sanitary Gaskets and High-Purity Hose Assemblies	
Qualiseal Technology	Harwood Heights, Illinois, United States	2017	Techetics Group	Sealing Products segment	
The Aseptic Group (comprising Aseptic Process Equipment SAS and Aseptic Services SARL)	Limonest, France	2019	Garlock Family of Companies (GHT)	Single-use components and tubing assemblies for the biopharmaceutical market	
LeanTeq Co., Ltd	Taoyuan City, Taiwan	2019	Technetics Group	Sealing Products segment	
Alluxa, Inc	Santa Rosa, CA	2020	AST	Optical Filters, thin film coatings	
NxEdge	Boise, ID	2021	AST	Cleaning, Coating and refurb for semiconductor	

=== Lawsuits ===
In June 2010, Garlock Sealing Technologies, a subsidiary of Enpro, filed for Chapter 11 bankruptcy, due to mounting liabilities from personal injury lawsuits related to asbestos-lined gaskets that it manufactured.

In March 2016, Enpro agreed to assume responsibility for all current and future asbestos claims related to Garlock Sealing Technologies and Garlock's parent company Coltec Industries, and set up a $480 million trust to resolve asbestos-related legal claims in the United States, as well as setting aside $17 million to cover asbestos claims in Canada.

In April 2017, Mississippi Attorney General Jim Hood filed a lawsuit against Enpro, Goodrich Corporation, and OldCo LLC, alleging that the companies polluted the environment and contaminated the ground water near a former Colt Industries (later Coltec Industries) carburetor manufacturing plant in Water Valley, Mississippi, by dumping and burying hazardous waste that contained trichloroethylene, a known carcinogen, on or near the plant site. The lawsuit was settled in 2020.

In June 2024, eight former employees of the same carburetor manufacturing plant in Water Valley, Mississippi, filed a federal negligence suit against Enpro, which currently owns the plant, alleging that their former employer exposed them to trichloroethylene, by releasing the carcinogenic chemical into the air, groundwater, and soil near the plant over five decades, leaving them with long-term symptoms including cancer and Parkinson’s disease.

== Business units ==
EnPro Industries’ businesses are organized into the following operating units:

=== CPI ===
Compressor Products International (CPI) designs, manufactures and markets components for large reciprocating compressors used in chemical plants, refineries and natural gas processing and transportation facilities.

=== Garlock ===
The Garlock family of companies comprises three businesses: Garlock Sealing Technologies, GPT, and Garlock Hygienic Technologies, which includes Rubber Fab and The Aseptic Group. Garlock serves a diverse range of industries including pharmaceutical, food and beverage, pulp and paper, metals and mining, marine, water / waste water, chemical processing, oil and gas, and power generation markets.

=== GGB ===
GGB is the Tribological Solution Provider for Industrial Progress, regardless of Shape or Material, serving the industrial, automotive, aerospace, renewable energy, and dozens of other industries.

=== STEMCO ===
STEMCO manufactures and supplies components to the heavy-duty truck and trailer markets in North America.

=== Technetics Group ===
Technetics Group provides engineered components, seals, assemblies and sub-systems for applications in the semiconductor, aerospace, power generation, medical, oil and gas, and other industries.
