= Furthering Asbestos Claims Transparency Act of 2015 =

Furthering Asbestos Claim Transparency (FACT) Act of 2015
- Long title: To amend title 11 of the United States Code to require the public disclosure by trusts established under section 524(g) of such title, of quarterly reports that contain detailed information regarding the receipt and disposition of claims for injuries based on exposure to asbestos; and for other purposes.
- Acronyms (colloquial): FACT Act
- Announced in: the 114th United States Congress
- Sponsored by: Rep. Blake Farenthold (R, TX-27)
- Number of co-sponsors: 3

Codification
- U.S.C. sections affected: 11 U.S.C. § 524, 11 U.S.C. § 107

Legislative history
- Introduced in the House as H.R. 526 by Rep. Blake Farenthold (R, TX-27) on January 26, 2015 (later amended to H.R. 1927 on January 6, 2014); Committee consideration by United States House Committee on the Judiciary, United States House Judiciary Subcommittee on Regulatory Reform, Commercial and Antitrust Law; Passed the U.S. House of Representatives on January 8, 2016 (211 - 188)

The Furthering Asbestos Claim Transparency (FACT) Act of 2015 (old bill number- H.R. 526, now Section 3 of H.R. 1927) is a bill introduced in the U.S. House of Representatives by Congressman Blake Farenthold that would require asbestos trusts in the United States to file quarterly reports about the payouts they make and personal information on the victims who receive them in a publicly accessible database. The legislation would also allow defendant corporations in asbestos cases to demand information from the trusts for any reason.

== Purpose ==
The intent of the bill, according to The Wall Street Journal, is to bring "transparency" to a system that is susceptible to abuse. However, according to The New York Times, the bill would limit or greatly slow down the ability of trusts to award compensation to victims by instituting additional requirements for filing and reporting.

Mesothelioma and other asbestos-related diseases often appear decades after exposure to asbestos.

A Wall Street Journal investigative report discovered hundreds of alleged inconsistencies between claims with trusts and in-court cases. The opinion article also claimed many implausible claims that children were exposed to asbestos while working in industrial settings.

The Government Accountability Office (GAO) studied asbestos trusts and concluded that the trusts operate without meaningful federal oversight. The GAO directly asked the asbestos trusts if their own audits uncovered fraud. In response, the trusts replied that they did not find any fraud among the more than $20 billion in claims paid out.

== Background ==
=== 1930s ===
In the 1930s corporations that manufactured asbestos knew that their product caused serious adverse health effects and even alarming rates of death among workers. Fearing the liability ramifications, the industry engaged in a large cover-up to hide the dangers to exposed workers. Although litigation by sick and injured victims began during this period, companies demanded confidentiality regarding settlement agreements. As a result, it took 45 years before the lethal nature of the product came to light.

=== 1980s ===
In 1981, federal scientists published data showing that asbestos contributed to causing more cancer cases than any other workplace exposure. The Center for Disease Control estimates that over 3,000 Americans still die from asbestos related diseases and cancers every year. Mesothelioma victims most often die 4–18 months after receiving diagnosis. The United States has not banned asbestos and it is still widely used in many common products.

=== 1994 law ===
In 1994, Congress passed legislation, amending §524 of the Bankruptcy Code, to establish special trusts to compensate past and future asbestos victims while allowing companies seeking bankruptcy protection to remain operating and economically healthy. Unlike other companies that file for Chapter 11 bankruptcy protection, companies filing under this special section of the Bankruptcy Code need not be insolvent, but rather merely must be "named as a defendant in personal injury, wrongful death, or property-damage actions seeking recovery for damages allegedly caused by the presence of, or exposure to, asbestos or asbestos-containing products". This legislation allowed the asbestos defendant to continue to operate as a profitable company while providing for yet unknown victims. Before these bankruptcy amendments were passed "courts had to find inventive ways to include future claimants in the proceeding." "The goal of the trusts is to compensate present and future claimants, equitably and outside the court system, by managing the debtor company's assets assumed by the trust as part of the bankruptcy reorganization," while relieving the company of any future asbestos related liability.

Once a trust has been established, the company has, essentially, already conceded liability. Therefore, to make a claim against a trust, a victim need not prove liability as in a normal lawsuit, but rather must show evidence of the diagnosis of an asbestos related disease/cancer, evidence of the place of exposure, and medical documentation discussing the extent that asbestos played in the illness.

== Procedural history ==
The FACT Act of 2015 was introduced in the U.S. House of Representatives by Rep. Blake Farenthold of Texas (TX-27) on January 26, 2015 and assigned to the House Judiciary Committee. A hearing on the FACT Act was held on February 4, 2015 by the United States House Judiciary Subcommittee on Regulatory Reform, Commercial and Antitrust Law. On May 14, the bill was voted out of the Judiciary Committee, 19-9, and was sent to be voted on by the full House of Representatives.

In December 2015, the FACT Act was added onto another U.S. House bill, H.R. 1927 (the Fairness in Class Action Litigation Act), and became Section 3 of H.R. 1927. The bill was renamed the "Fairness in Class Action Litigation and Furthering Asbestos Claim Transparency Act of 2016.

On January 8, 2016, the U.S. House of Representatives passed H.R. 1927 by a vote of 211 to 188. The vote was largely along party lines, with no Democrats voting for it and sixteen Republicans voting against it.

According to a Statement of Administration Policy, issued by the Office of Management and Budget on January 6, 2016, "The [Obama] Administration strongly opposes House passage of H.R. 1927 because it would impair the enforcement of important federal laws, constrain access to the courts, and needlessly threaten the privacy of asbestos victims." It continues, "if the president were presented with H.R.1927, his senior advisers would recommend that he veto the bill."

Similar versions of the FACT Act legislation have been passed the House of Representatives in previous Republican-controlled sessions, including in 2013. In 2013, although the bill passed the House, it was never voted on by the Senate.

== Provisions ==
According to the Congressional Research Service, the FACT Act requires an asbestos trust to file with the court "quarterly reports, available on the public docket, which describe each demand the trust has received from a claimant and the basis for any payment made to that claimant."

In addition, the legislation "requires such reports, upon written request, and subject to payment (demanded at the option of the trust) for any reasonable cost incurred by it, to provide any information related to payment from, and demands for payment from, the trust to any party to any action in law or equity concerning liability for asbestos exposure."

== Debate ==
=== Veterans ===
The FACT Act of 2015 would have disproportionately affected veterans suffering from asbestos related illnesses and cancers. "Veterans who received compensation from an asbestos trust could have their work histories, compensation amount and partial Social Security numbers posted in bulk on a court's public docket." While veterans make up only 8% of our population, 30% of mesothelioma victims were exposed to asbestos while serving the country. According to the Veterans Administration, "veterans who served in any of the following occupations may have been exposed to asbestos: mining, milling, shipyard work, insulation work, demolition of old buildings, carpentry and construction, manufacturing and installation of products such as flooring and roofing."

In an op-ed written for The Hill, Blake Farenthold (TX-27), the bills sponsor in the House of Representatives, argued that without it, asbestos trusts will run out. He claims, as a result, they will not be able to pay the veterans, first responders, workers and other Americans who will become sick in the future from asbestos exposure that occurred in the past. In response to Mr. Farentholds op-ed, leadership from three major veterans organizations responded with an article titled "Farenthold has his facts wrong: The FACT Act hurts veterans." Representatives from The Military Order of the Purple Heart of the U.S.A (MOPH), American Veterans (AMVETS), and the Association of the United States Navy (AUSN), explained that the FACT Act of 2015 "would be extremely detrimental to our members and all veterans who were exposed to asbestos while serving their country, in addition to their family members. Veterans disproportionately make up those who are dying and afflicted with mesothelioma and other asbestos-related illnesses and injuries."

According to Stars and Stripes (newspaper), a "newspaper that reports on matters affecting members of the United States Armed Forces," "at least 16 national veterans groups came out strongly against it prior to the vote, warning it would allow companies to delay the claims of terminally ill veterans while exposing their sensitive personal information to identity theft." Veterans who received compensation from an asbestos trust could have their work histories, compensation amount and partial Social Security numbers posted in bulk on a court's public docket,

In January 2016, several veterans organizations have come out in opposition to the legislation, explaining (in an Op-Ed) "it will add significant time and delay in paying claims to our veterans and their families by putting burdensome and costly reporting requirements on trusts." Groups signed onto the op-ed include, Air Force Sergeants Association (AFSA), Air Force Women Officers Associated (AFWOA), American Veterans (AMVETS), Association of the United States Navy (AUSN), Commissioned Officers Association of the U.S. Public Health Service, Fleet Reserve Association (FRA), Jewish War Veterans of the USA (JWV), Marine Corps Reserve Association (MCRA), Military Officers Association of America (MOAA), Military Order of the Purple Heart (MOPH), National Association for Uniformed Services (NAUS), National Defense Council, Naval Enlisted Reserve Association (NERA), The Retired Enlisted Association (TREA), U.S. Coast Guard Chief Petty Officers Association, U.S. Army Warrant Officers Association, Vietnam Veterans of America (VVA).

In a letter to the Senate Judiciary Committee the veterans organizations called the FACT Act "a cynical ploy by the asbestos industry to avoid compensating its victims who are seeking justice in court."

=== Privacy ===
The FACT Act would require public disclosure of personal information of asbestos victims. Under the legislation, the only information shielded from the disclosure is "confidential medical records" and a victims "full social security number." According to a 2013 piece published in The Hill's Congress Blog by Susan Vento, widow of Congressman Bruce Vento, and Judy van Ness, with the Asbestos Cancer Victims' Rights Campaign, information that may be requested and publicly disclosed includes the victims name, address, date of birth, last four digits of their social security number, information about children and spouses, employment history, salary history, information about their medical condition, and personal finances.

Patient and consumer advocates have expressed concern that making this information easily accessible could leave sick and dying asbestos victims and their families, vulnerable to identity theft and other frauds. In a coalition letter to Congress, consumer advocates raised the possibility of "predators, con artists and unscrupulous businesses" scouring the public disclosures for asbestos victims personal information.

Speaking with reporters on a January 2016 conference call, Senator Chuck Schumer explained that requiring disclosure of their personal information online would deter "veterans from filing for the money they are owed but would also result in an egregious violation of their privacy and expose them to identity theft," and called the bill "offensive invasion of the privacy of those who defended this country."

==== HIPAA ====
HIPAA laws that protect patient privacy only apply to a distinct group of "covered entities" and do not apply to asbestos trust. During one U.S. House Judiciary Committee hearing, Congressman Hank Johnson (D- GA) offered an amendment to the legislation that required trust to abide by HIPAA laws but the measure failed 12-18.

=== Compliance costs ===
Trust representatives have explained, in letters to Congress, that the reporting and compliance requirements of the FACT Act would require large victim trusts to spend tens of thousands of additional hours every year to compile the lists and respond to all information requests allowed by this legislation. Funds used to fulfill these new requirements would come from the limited pool of money available to pay claims. A study by RAND found that the asbestos trusts are already underfunded. They reported the median payment from asbestos trusts to victims is 25% of the value of the claim. Some payments are as low as 1.1 percent of the claim's value.

Several asbestos trusts have expressed strong opposition to this legislation, in part because of the burdensome administrative costs that will significantly reduce recoveries for future trust claimants.

=== Payment delays ===
Cancer patient rights advocates say the FACT Act will cause long delays in payment of trust claims. Elihu Inselbuch, an expert on trust management and partner at Caplin & Drysdale, explained that because trusts will be buried in additional paperwork, the FACT Act "would slow down or stop the process by which the trusts review and pay claims, such that many victims would die before receiving compensation, since victims of mesothelioma typically only live for 4 to 18 months after their diagnosis." In many cases, "the delays in trust payment will force dying plaintiffs, who are in desperate need of funds, to settle for lower amounts with solvent defendants.… Delay is a weapon for asbestos defendants."

== Support and opposition ==
=== Supporters ===
This bill is sponsored by Republicans in the House of Representatives and Senate. The FACT Act is also supported by the United States Chamber of Commerce, which listed the bill as one of their top legislative priorities of the 114th legislative session. In their letter to Congress, the U.S. Chamber claims this legislation is needed to shine a light on asbestos victim trusts and prevent "double-dipping" by victims.

Supporters include:

- 60 Plus Association
- Air Force Association, Department of Indiana
- American Insurance Association
- American Military Society
- Arizona Chamber of Commerce & Industry
- Arizona Manufacturers Council
- BCA
- Civil Justice Association of California
- Coalition for Common Sense
- Cost of Freedom, Indiana Chapter
- Florida Chamber of Commerce
- Florida Justice Reform Institute
- Georgia Chamber of Commerce
- Hamilton County Veterans
- Illinois Chamber of Commerce
- Lawsuit Reform Alliance of New York
- Louisiana Association of Business and Industry
- Michigan Chamber of Commerce
- Military Officers Association of America, Indianapolis Chapter
- Missing in America Project of Indiana
- National Association of Manufacturers
- National Association of Mutual Insurance Companies
- National Black Chamber of Commerce
- New Jersey Civil Justice Institute
- North Carolina Chamber of Commerce
- Pennsylvania Chamber of Business & Industry
- Reserve Officers Association, Department of Indiana
- Save Our Veterans
- South Carolina Civil Justice Coalition
- Taxpayers Protection Alliance
- Texas Civil Justice League
- Texas Coalition of Veterans Organizations
- The Cost of Freedom, Inc. of Indiana
- TLR
- U.S. Chamber Institute for Legal Reform
- U.S. Chamber of Commerce
- Veteran Resource List
- West Virginia Business & Industry Council
- West Virginia Chamber
- Wisconsin Manufacturers & Commerce

=== Opponents ===
Opponents of the legislation dispute the motivation of the law and the need to prevent double dipping. 'Double-dippers' are alleged to file multiple claims that may not be congruent with one another, and thus, may be considered fraudulent." In testimony to Congress, asbestos trust expert, Elihu Inselbuch explained that the idea that victims can double-dip is largely false. "When an asbestos victim recovers from each defendant whose product contributed to their disease, that victim is in no way 'double-dipping;' rather they are recovering a portion of their damages from each of the corporations who harmed them. In fact, each trust is responsible for and pays for only its own share of the damages." In 2011, the Government Accountability Office investigated possible frauds in the Asbestos Victim Trusts and could not find one example of a fraudulent claim.

In October 2015, in a piece written for The Hill, titled "Farenthold has his facts wrong: The FACT Act hurts veterans," representatives from The Military Order of the Purple Heart of the U.S.A (MOPH), American Veterans (AMVETS), and the Association of the United States Navy (AUSN), explained their organizations' strong opposition to this "legislation due to its detrimental and disparate impact on men and women in uniform." They explained the FACT Act of 2015 "would be extremely detrimental to our members and all veterans who were exposed to asbestos while serving their country, in addition to their family members. Veterans disproportionately make up those who are dying and afflicted with mesothelioma and other asbestos-related illnesses and injuries." In addition, according to Stars and Stripes (newspaper), 16 veterans groups came out in strong opposition to the FACT Act.

Various groups that oppose the legislation include:

- AFL-CIO
- Alliance for Justice
- AFSCME
- American Association for Justice
- American Veterans
- Asbestos Disease Awareness Organization
- Asbestos Cancer Victims' Rights Campaign
- Association of the United States Navy
- Center for Effective Government
- Center for Justice & Democracy
- Communications Workers of America
- ConnectiCOSH
- Connecticut Center for Patient Safety
- Constitutional Alliance
- Consumer Action
- Consumer Watchdog
- Environmental Working Group Action Fund
- Essential Information
- Government Accountability Project
- International Association of Fire Fighters
- Knox Area Workers' Memorial Day Committee
- Labor & Employment Committee of the National Lawyers Guild
- Maine Labor Group on Health
- Military Order of the Purple Heart of the U.S.A.
- National Association of Consumer Advocates- NACA
- National Educational Association
- National Employment Lawyers Association
- National Consumers League
- National Council for Occupational Safety and Health
- New England Regional Council of Carpenters
- New Jersey State Industrial Union Council
- New Solutions: A Journal of Environmental and Occupational Health Policy
- NHCOSH
- Occupational Health Clinical Centers, Syracuse, New York
- Occupational Safety & Health Law Project
- OpentheGovernment.org
- Patient Privacy Rights
- Privacy Rights Clearinghouse
- Privacy Times
- Protect All Children's Environment
- Public Citizen
- RICOSH
- SafeWork Washington
- TURN-The Utility Reform Network
- U.S. Public Interest Research Group (U.S. PIRG)
- United Steelworkers
- Western New York Council on Occupational Safety and Health
- Worksafe
- World Privacy Forum
