= Technetics Group =

- Company type: Subsidiary
- Industry: Manufacturing
- Predecessor: Technetics, Plastomer Technologies, Garlock France, Tara Technologies, Wide Range Elastomers Limited, Garlock Helicoflex, Hydrodyne, Qualiseal Technology
- Founded: 2012
- Headquarters: Columbia, South Carolina, United States
- Area served: Worldwide
- Key people: Gilles Hudon (President)
- Products: metal seals polymer seals & components mechanical seals burst discs semiconductor subsystems acoustic media abradable material inflatable seals accumulators bellows
- Services: surface and coating technologies plastic machining etching advanced assemblies testing and design
- Number of employees: 900
- Parent: EnPro Industries (NYSE: NPO)
- Website: technetics.com

Technetics Group is one of six operating divisions of Enpro Industries, Inc., a producer of engineered industrial products for the processing and general manufacturing industries, worldwide.

Technetics Group is headquartered in Columbia, South Carolina, United States. It manufactures custom-designed industrial seals, components and subsystems for extreme application uses within the aerospace, nuclear power, life sciences, oil and gas, industrial turbines, and semiconductor industries. Additionally, Technetics Group also provides a number of services including surface and coating technologies, plastics machining, fluoropolymer etching, and seal testing, design and analysis. As of 2016, Technetics Group has a workforce of over 900 employees, and operates manufacturing facilities in Columbia, South Carolina; DeLand, Florida; Santa Clara, California; Houston, Texas; Daytona, Florida; Hatfield, Pennsylvania; Saint-Étienne, France; Montibrison, France; Singapore; and Leicester, England, United Kingdom.

In 1969, Technetics Group began a research and development partnership with CEA, the French Atomic Energy and Alternative Energy Agency. Today, Technetics Group and CEA share personnel and resources to operate maestral laboratory (spelled with a lowercase "m"), located in Pierrelatte, France. The team at maestral laboratory studies and develops sealing products for use in harsh environments, characterized, for example, by high pressure, high temperature, complex mechanical stresses, and interactions between materials, fluids, and aggressive bacteria. Personnel at maestral laboratory perform testing, characterization and simulation of sealing systems in these environments. Located in the Rhone Valley, CEA Marcoule carries out research and development in the fields of nuclear fuel cycling, waste management, dismantling and remediation technologies.

== History ==
Technetics Group includes a number of acquired businesses, including Tara Technologies, Wide Range Elastomers, Hydrodyne, Technetics, Plastomer Technologies, Qualiseal Technology, Garlock France and Garlock Helicoflex.

== Operating units ==
- Technetics Group Columbia – Technetics Group Columbia manufactures metal seals for the aerospace and nuclear power industries, and was formerly known as Garlock Helicoflex.
- Technetics Group DeLand – Technetics Group DeLand was purchased by EnPro Industries in 2009, and manufactures abradable seals, acoustic materials, brush seals, and burst discs.
- Technetics PTFE & Polymer Solutions – Technetics PTFE & Polymer Solutions based in Houston manufactures polytetrafluoroethylene (PTFE) seals and components, and was formerly known as Plastomer Technologies.
- Technetics Group Daytona – Technetics Group Daytona, which was known as Tara Technologies when it was acquired in 2011, manufactures edge-welded metal bellows, carbon face seals, and hydrodynamic seals.
- Technetics Group Singapore – Technetics Group Singapore, which was known as Tara Technologies when it was purchased in 2011, manufactures edge-welded metal bellows.
- Technetics Group France – Technetics Group France manufactures metal seals, inflatable seals, spiral wound gaskets, mechanical seals, brush seals, and quick disconnect systems, and was formerly known as Garlock France.
- Technetics Group Leicester – Technetics Group Leicester, which was known as Wide Range Elastomers when it was acquired in 2009, manufactures elastomeric seals and profiles for the aerospace, medical and pharmaceutical industries.

== Brands ==
- HELICOFLEX
- CEFIL'AIR
- ORIGRAF
- BELFAB
- FELTMETAL
- C-FLEX
- O-FLEX
- E-FLEX
- FARGRAF
- VITAFLEX
- TEXOLON
- PLASTOLON
- AMICON
- RELIC WRAP
- PRIME-ETCH
- GULLIVER
- CEFILAC GPA
- HELICOCARB
