= Arthur Luxenberg =

American attorney, partner at the Manhattan law firm Weitz & Luxenberg

Arthur Luxenberg is an American attorney and partner at the Manhattan law firm Weitz & Luxenberg, which he co-founded in 1986.
