= Weitz & Luxenberg =

Law firm based in New York, US

- Headquarters: New York City, U.S.
- Offices: New Jersey, California, Michigan
- Major practice areas: Mass tort, product liability, asbestos litigation, environmental litigation, pharmaceutical litigation
- Date founded: 1986
- Founders: Perry Weitz, Arthur Luxenberg
- Company type: Law firm
- Website: www.weitzlux.com

Weitz & Luxenberg is a plaintiffs' law firm based in New York City, with additional offices in New Jersey, California, and Michigan. The firm is noted for its work in mass tort litigation, representing clients in asbestos, defective product, pharmaceutical, environmental, and consumer protection cases.

== History ==
The firm was founded in 1986 by attorneys Perry Weitz and Arthur Luxenberg. Its early reputation developed through asbestos litigation, including a 1991 trial involving workers from the Brooklyn Navy Yard that resulted in one of the largest asbestos verdicts of its time.

In 2025, the firm secured a $117 million jury award for a World Trade Center steel worker exposed to asbestos, one of the largest individual verdicts in New York related to asbestos illness.

Over the decades, the firm expanded its practice to include pharmaceutical and medical device cases, defective consumer products, and large-scale environmental contamination lawsuits. It has represented clients across the United States and obtained significant verdicts and settlements.

== Practice areas ==
The firm focuses on large, complex litigation related to corporate accountability. Major areas of practice include:

- Asbestos and mesothelioma litigation: Representing individuals exposed to asbestos, including leadership in securing verdicts and settlements for mesothelioma and related diseases.
- Pharmaceutical and medical device litigation: Involvement in multidistrict litigation regarding drugs and medical devices such as hip implants and transvaginal mesh products.
- Environmental litigation: Representation of communities affected by water contamination and toxic spills, including MTBE contamination and Flint, Michigan.
- Defective products and consumer protection: Litigation involving unsafe or defective consumer products.

== Notable cases ==
- A $75 million asbestos verdict in the early 1990s.
- A $190 million consolidated asbestos verdict in New York in 2013.
- Participation in a $2.5 billion settlement involving defective DePuy hip implants.
- Environmental contamination representation, including water pollution cases in Hoosick Falls, New York, and Flint, Michigan.
- A $27 million settlement with DuPont in a PFAS contamination case in New York.

== Recognition ==
The firm and its attorneys have been listed in publications such as Best Lawyers in America, Super Lawyers, and the National Law Journal's Top Verdicts Hall of Fame.

In 2023, attorney Robin Greenwald was inducted into the Trial Lawyer Hall of Fame for her work in environmental law.

In 2013, co-founding managing partner Arthur Luxenberg was named Lawyer of the Year for mass tort litigation in New York City by Best Lawyers.

In 2025, attorney Ellen Relkin received the Lifetime Achievement Award from the American Association for Justice for her leadership in mass torts and multidistrict litigation.

Perry Weitz, co-founder of the firm, was featured in New York Magazine, where he was recognized for his contributions to mass tort litigation.
