= John Crane Group =

Manufacturer of mechanical seals

John Crane
- Type: Subsidiary
- Industry: Oil & Gas, Power Generation, Chemical, Pharmaceutical, Pulp & Paper, Mining
- Founded: 1917
- Founders: John Crane and Frank Payne
- Headquarters: Slough, United Kingdom
- Area served: Global
- Key people: Ruben Alvarez (President) 1st February 2025
- Revenue: ▲£1,079m (2023)
- Number of employees: More than 6,000 employees in over 200 locations in 50 countries
- Parent: Smiths Group
- Website: John Crane

John Crane is a company headquartered in Slough, United Kingdom, that provides engineered products and services including mechanical seals, couplings, seal support systems, filtration systems and digital diagnostics technologies. Founded in 1917 in Chicago as Crane Packing Co., and now a subsidiary of Smiths Group, the company services customers in the energy services sector including production, transmission and storage, refining, power generation, petrochemical, pulp and paper, and mining industries.

John Crane is the largest subsidiary of Smiths Group plc, a global technology business listed on the London Stock Exchange. John Crane has end user customers in process industries, including large oil companies, national oil companies (NOCs), and refineries. The company also serves original equipment manufacturers (OEM) customers engaged in the design and manufacture of pumps and turbines.

== History ==
John Crane was founded in 1917 as Crane Packing Company. Before founding his company, engineer John Crane patented a flexible, lubricated metallic packing (#956,042) in 1910. In 1915, Crane patented the manufacturing method for flexible metallic packing (#1,151,344). He discovered that wrapping his flex packing in metallic foil increased its longevity and kept the cylinders’ surface smooth and uniform. Frank Payne, a sales representative for the Warren Packing Company, recognized the potential of Crane's innovation.

Crane Packing Company initially manufactured packing and gasketing, which is still offered today. Prior to World War II, Crane Packing sold its England-based operations to Tube Investments, known today as TI Group PLC. Condenser Tube Packing was introduced in 1922 and in 1928, Metallic water pump packing was used on Chevrolet and Ford cars. An estimated 25 million motors were using Crane Packing materials by the mid-1930s. By 1938, all Chrysler cars used Crane Packing mechanical seals on their water pumps .

In 1939, the company invented the first automotive mechanical seal. In the early 1940s, John Crane developed and introduced patented end face shaft seals and an elastomer bellows seal. The U.S. Navy relied on packing solutions from Crane Packing for a host of applications, including expansion joints, stern tube service, cargo pumps, rotary steam and air compressors, water-tight closures, metallic condenser packing and pipe fittings. In recognition for its service, Crane Packing received a U.S. Navy “E” Award. From the years 1941 to 1949, Crane Packing applied for and received 24 patents, the majority of which were for mechanical seals designed to handle high-pressure and corrosive applications.

In 1948, Crane Packing developed its own seal face lapping machines and processes, which evolved into Crane Packing's Lapmaster division. Another advancement of sealing and packing technology during this period was the commercial availability of polytetrafluoroethylene (PTFE), marketed by its creator DuPont as Teflon. Crane Packing introduced its “CHEMLON” line of Teflon-based packing material for use on pumps, valves, hydraulic fittings and cylinders, coaxial cables, and gaskets in 1948.

Old John Crane Advertisement

In 1950, Crane Packing purchased 26 acres (110,000 m^{2}) of land in Morton Grove, Illinois, a suburb of Chicago. Construction began on the new company offices the next year and continued until the main office, laboratory, and cafeteria were completed in 1956. John Crane's Morton Grove facility comprises five manufacturing buildings totaling 453,000 square feet (42,100 m^{2}).

In the 1980s, John Crane introduced the Type 28 non-contacting, gas lubricated gas seal,- another breakthrough in sealing technology. In 1987, through a series of acquisitions and divestitures, the company in the United States and the company in the United Kingdom were reunited, this time under the name John Crane.

Beginning in the 1990s, John Crane applied non-contacting technology to pumps handling liquids that are hazardous to the environment. Applying this technology to a standard American National Standards Institute (ANSI) or American Petroleum Institute (API) pump allows users to meet or exceed the Environmental Protection Agency's (EPA) stringent regulations for hazardous emissions.

In 2007, the company acquired CDI Energy Services, CDI Oilfield Services, Fiberod and Global Energy Products. This branch of the company specializes in artificial lift equipment and services for upstream oil and gas production. In a reorganization of John Crane's parent firm, Smiths Group, the artificial lift business was divested in 2016.

John Crane still offers the mechanical packing and gasket products upon which the Crane Packing Company built its success. Each year, the company manufactures some 238,900 miles of braided packing―almost enough to reach the Moon―along with flat gaskets and live-load packing for valves. Following the Russian invasion of Ukraine in February 2022, the company continued to operate in Russia through its subsidiary John Crane Iskra LLC, which is 50% owned by the John Crane Group.

== Litigation ==
=== Asbestos ===
John Crane Group filed lawsuits against Simon Greenstone Panatier and Shein Law Center in 2016 in federal court in Illinois. The suit alleged that Shein withheld evidence in violation of the RICO Act in cases brought against John Crane by sufferers of mesothelioma. Specifically, the suits allege that the law firms failed to disclose during discovery that their clients had been exposed to products containing asbestos made by other companies and intentionally delayed filing claims against those companies' bankruptcy trusts. John Crane said that it would have avoided judgements and "substantial defense costs" if it had known this information.

George Hodges, a bankruptcy judge in the U.S. District Court for the Western District of North Carolina, called the conduct of the law firms “wide-ranging, systematic and well-concealed fraud."
