= Simon Greenstone Panatier =

Law firm based in Dallas, Texas

Simon Greenstone Panatier, PC
- Headquarters: Dallas
- Offices: Long Beach; New York; Houston
- No. of attorneys: 10 (shareholders); 21 (associates)
- Major practice areas: Wrongful death Product Liability; Torts
- Key people: Jeffrey B. Simon; David C. Greenstone; Christopher J. Panatier
- Date founded: February 2006; 19 years ago
- Founder: Jeffrey B. Simon; David C. Greenstone
- Company type: Professional corporation
- Website: www.sgptrial.com

Simon Greenstone Panatier is a law firm based in Dallas, Texas, specializing in personal injury litigation and tort liability.

== History ==
The firm was founded as Simon, Eddins & Greenstone in 2005 by three lawyers from Waters & Kraus.

Jeffrey Simon is one of the firm's founding partners. As of December 2015, Simon was head of the Texas Trial Lawyers Association. Simon holds an undergraduate degree from Colgate University and a law degree from the University of Texas.

== Cases ==
Simon Greenstone has represented numerous plaintiffs in asbestos-related cases, particularly victims of mesothelioma. In 2014, a Dallas County jury awarded a mesothelioma sufferer $18.6 million in damages, including $15 million in punitive damages. In April 2016 an Arizona federal jury awarded $17 million in a wrongful death action, the largest jury verdict in Arizona in 2016.

On September 29, 2017, Simon filed a lawsuit on behalf of Upshur County in East Texas against a number of pharmaceutical companies for their role in creating and promoting the nation's opioid epidemic, the first time that a Texas county had sued the companies.

=== Racketeering ===
Simon Greenstone was one of five law firms sued for violations of the Racketeer Influenced and Corrupt Organizations Act (RICO) by asbestos gasket manufacturer Garlock Sealing Technologies in January 2014. During its bankruptcy proceedings, Garlock convinced the presiding judge, George Hodges, that Simon Greenstone and other firms deliberately delayed filing claims against asbestos bankruptcy trusts on behalf of their clients in order to exaggerate Garlock's responsibility for their injuries. Simon Greenstone later filed against Garlock that also alleged racketeering. Simon Greenstone and Garlock reached a settlement in March 2016. EnPro, Garlock's parent company, agreed to form a $480 million bankruptcy trust to resolve all current and future asbestos claims.

On January 25, 2016, John Crane filed to intervene in the suit against Simon Greenstone and made racketeering claims distinct from those made by Garlock. Simon Greenstone filed a breach-of-contract suit against John Crane in federal court in Los Angeles, California alleging that John Crane violated previous settlement agreements when it filed to intervene. In June 2016, John Crane filed an independent RICO suit against Simon Greenstone. The Illinois federal court found it was the wrong jurisdiction and the case was dismissed without prejudice to refile in the proper courts.

== Philanthropy ==
Simon Greenstone Panatier provides $50,000 college scholarships for Dallas students whose lives have been disrupted by cancer.
