= Lester Brickman =

American law professor

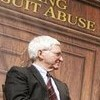
- Born: September 4, 1940 (age 86); New York, New York
- Education: University of Florida; Yale University; Carnegie-Mellon University
- Known for: Being a Professor of Law
- Spouse: Miriam Dorf Brickman

Lester Brickman is an emeritus professor at the Benjamin N. Cardozo School of Law of the Yeshiva University and a legal scholar. He is one of the founding faculty members of the Cardozo, recruited by Yeshiva University in 1976 from the University of Toledo College of Law. On May 31, 2016, Professor Brickman received the Monrad Paulsen Award of the Cardozo School, upon his retirement from teaching. He taught contracts, legal ethics and Land Use and Zoning at the Cardozo School of Law. He is the author of a book, Lawyer Barons: What Their Contingency Fees Really Cost America (Cambridge University Press, 2011), a detailed critique of perceived abuses and excessive costs of the American tort system, with proposals for reform. Brickman is a graduate of Carnegie Mellon University. He holds a juris doctor degree from the University of Florida and an LLM degree from Yale Law School.

Professor Brickman has written on asbestos litigation and tort reform. Brickman, with co-authors Jeffrey O'Connell and Michael Horowitz, proposed the Early Offer model of allocating contingent fees. University of Virginia Law professor O'Connell and co-authors wrote in 2007 of this proposal for medical malpractice cases that it "attempts to reduce transactions costs, expedite payments, and address the ... victim's economic losses. Supported by tort reform advocate Walter Olson, Widener Commonwealth Law School professor Christopher J. Robinette, and New Hampshire physician Dr. Kevin Pho, the early offer proposal was adopted as law in New Hampshire in June 2012, over the strenuous objections of the state's governor and plaintiff bar.

Another area in which his reform efforts have been successful is that of nonrefundable retainers. After Brickman and his former student Lawrence Cunningham wrote several law review articles and an amicus curiae brief arguing that they are ethically and legally impermissible, the New York Court of Appeals struck down their use by lawyers in New York State. This holding has been adopted in other states.

Brickman played a significant role as an expert witness in a controversial 2013 case in the United States Bankruptcy Court for the Western District of North Carolina, In Re Garlock Sealing Technologies, LLC., et al., debtor. Counsel for Garlock, Garland Cassada of the Charlotte NC law firm Robinson, Bradshaw & Hinson, was successful in persuading Judge George Hodges to permit full discovery of 15 high-value asbestos claims settled by Garlock when it was a solvent entity. Using data obtained from these cases by Cassada, Professor Brickman's expert report set forth evidence of fraud, misrepresentation and "double-dipping" (contradictory accounts of exposure between tort and bankruptcy-trust claims) in all 15 cases, the net effect of which was to inflate the value of future claims that may be made against the bankrupt entity. The claimants, represented by the Garlock Asbestos Claims Committee, had estimated that future liability as high as $1.3 billion. Judge Hodges, in his January 10, 2014 "Order Estimating Aggregate Liability," reduced the amount required for the bankruptcy trust by more than $1 billion, to $125 million, asserting that:

The purpose of this Order is to determine Garlock's responsibility for causing mesothelioma and the aggregate amount of money that is required to satisfy its liability to present claimants and future victims. The estimates of Garlock's aggregate liability that are based on its historic settlement values are not reliable because those values are infected with the impropriety of some law firms and inflated by the cost of defense. The best evidence of Garlock's aggregate responsibility is the projection of its legal liability that takes into consideration causation, limited exposure and the contribution of exposures to other products. The court has determined that $125 million is sufficient to satisfy Garlock's liability for the legitimate present and future mesothelioma claims against it.

== See also ==
- Asbestos and the law

== Early life and education ==
=== Childhood ===
Lester Brickman was born September 4, 1940, in New York City, to Frank B. Brickman (1900-1981) and Lillian Bernstein Brickman (1902-1989), the second of three siblings. The family were, at the time, living on Walton Avenue in the Bronx. Frank Brickman was a grocer and bookkeeper in New York City and, later, a kosher inspector in Florida, after the family moved to the Miami Beach area in 1953.

According to the U.S. Census of 1930, Frank B. Brickman was born in Poland, but the 1940 enumeration lists his country of birth as Russia. This was not an unusual ambiguity for emigrant Jews who had been born in the Russo-Polish Pale of Settlement. In a 1977 interview with a United Press International reporter, Brickman said he had been born in "Lornza, Poland [probably Łomża] and raised in Germany, where his family operated a grocery. He came to the U.S. in 1920 and became a wholesale grocer in New York." He told the reporter he was fluent in Hebrew, Yiddish, Polish, Russian and German as well as English.

Frank Brickman arrived in the United States in 1920 or 1921 and married Lillian Bernstein in 1928. Their first child, Jeremiah Brickman (1930-1950), earned a baccalaureate at New York University in 1949, then attended Harvard Law School, where he died in October 1950 after receiving what the Harvard Crimson called "a mysterious head injury" in the university's Hillel House. Conflicting police and autopsy reports, and a suggestion of murder by journalist Walter Winchell, kept the case in the news for several weeks, but no arrests were made, and the death was ruled accidental.

A younger sibling, Gloria Brickman, was born in March 1945; she married Michael Kenneth Supran in 1967 and resides in Florida.

=== Secondary and post-secondary education ===
Frank and Lillian Brickman's second child, Lester, was reportedly what is known in Yiddish as a yeshiva bocher, receiving his education in Hebrew schools until he reached high school age. Lester Brickman was a high-achieving student, one of Miami Beach Senior High School's student chemistry laboratory assistants, member of the French Club (1956), National Speech and Debate Association, National Forensic League, and National Honor Society (1957), and president of the school's Junior Optimist Club in 1957, his senior year.

Brickman won a four-year national scholarship from the Food Fair Foundation to what was then the Carnegie Institute of Technology in Pittsburgh (now Carnegie Mellon University), earning a Bachelor of Science in Chemistry from the Mellon College of Science in 1961. In his freshman year at Carnegie Tech, in April 1958, Brickman published an article sharply criticizing his own public-school secondary education in Carnegie Technical, an undergraduate opinion magazine, thinly disguising the name of the high school as "Marlin Boom." His and other student views were quoted in the local newspapers, one of which noted that "Brickman ... hurls ... brickbats at what he calls American anti-intellectualism." In the October and December 1958 and February–April 1959 issues of Carnegie Technical Magazine, Brickman appeared on the masthead as associate editor, and in the May 1959 issue, in which he also had an article on brainstorming, as Features Editor. He became Managing Editor of Carnegie Technical in April 1960.

As he had been in high school, Brickman was active in several campus organizations at Carnegie Tech, including the theatrical group Scotch 'n' Soda, as sales manager of the Carnegie Tech yearbook, known as the Thistle, which he is said to have reorganized along "financially independent" lines, serving as a dormitory counselor, and in the Student Congress, for which he was awarded an honor, a Jeweled Activity Key, at the end of the spring term of 1960.

In an early harbinger of his later logomachies in print, Brickman launched a campaign in 1960 to convince the Carnegie Tech Men's Dormitory Council of the manifest injustice of permitting Carnegie Tech's women students only two dorm-room visits per year to the Council's "protectorate," the men's dormitories in which Brickman was a resident and counselor. Predictably, this effort drew the published ire of the target organization. James R. Powers, then President of the Council, reviled Brickman's progressive position on opposite-sex visitation to male residence halls in a student-newspaper op-ed, saying of him that "This notorious gentleman of recent Thistle reorganization fame has taken it upon himself to be the conscience of Carnegie Tech" and to be the "self-chosen liberator of the masses of Tech students." At this period, women comprised about 10 per cent of Carnegie Tech's student body. Their visits to the quarters of the opposite sex remained restricted for the rest of the decade.

After graduation from Carnegie Tech, Brickman attended law school at the University of Florida, where he made the dean's list, law review and the Order of the Coif. Writing many years later of his experiences at the University of Florida, Brickman said of himself that "My true colors emerged during my second year in law school, which I devoted substantially to a self-directed, law-in-action analysis of motion picture censorship in Florida. ... Accepted for publication by the law review, the paper was so 'hot' that the lobbyists for the industry, who were influential in state government and in the university, were able to get the dean of the law school to block its publication."

Despite this defeat by the combined forces of commercial and academic censorship, Brickman received a Bachelor of Laws (LLB) degree in 1964. The following summer at the Miami Beach law firm of Sibley, Giblin, King & Levenson was to be Brickman's only experience in the practice of law in his long career. He returned to academe at the end of the summer, on a Sterling Fellowship to Yale University, where he earned a Master of Laws (LL.M.) degree in 1965. By the fall term of 1965, Brickman was an assistant professor at the University of Toledo College of Law.

== Academic career ==
=== University of Toledo College of Law ===
Brickman's eleven years at the University of Toledo College of Law, as an assistant professor (1965-1968), associate professor (1968-1971) and full professor (1971-1976), were the central component of what he was later to call his "liberal days," when much of his work focused on social justice, poverty law, urban housing and zoning, campaign finance reform, living conditions for migrant workers, youth employment, and racial and gender equality. In 1967, when he was jointly appointed as a visiting research professor by the Council on Legal Education for Professional Responsibility in New York City, Brickman developed a course at Toledo on law and poverty, a subject at that time taught in only a handful of law schools nationwide, establishing in that year the College's Law and Poverty Clinic. He also served as a consultant to the community action programs division of the U.S. Office of Economic Opportunity (OEO).

In 1968, his course syllabus was published by the Ohio State Legal Services Association in both print and Braille editions. He also taught, wrote, and carried out research, some of it sponsored by the Ford Foundation, National Science Foundation, and the Council on Legal Education for Professional Responsibility, on the efficiency and effectiveness of legal systems, legal paraprofessionalism, and group legal services, as well as the role of clinical education in law schools.

In 1975, Brickman developed a course for the University of Toledo College of Law on a topic to which he was to make a lifetime scholarly commitment and many later contributions: legal ethics, and ethical lawyering. This, with other early works by Brickman, are held in the archives of the LeValley Law Library of the University of Toledo. He published five more articles in 1975, his last year in Toledo, including two advocating a reduction of restrictions on lawyer advertising (see list of publications below).

Brickman wrote of his time in Toledo soon after taking up his position on the faculty at Cardozo in New York City, in the recently established University of Toledo Law Review, on the occasion of Karl Krastin's (1910-1998) retirement from the institution. He recalled the "'go-go' reputation about the law school at Toledo. It was looked upon as a place where much was happening; where there was much intellectual ferment and movement toward excellence."

=== Cardozo School of Law at Yeshiva University ===
There was plenty of ferment, intellectual and otherwise, at the newly founded Cardozo when Brickman returned to his native city in 1976. The school's founding dean, Monrad G. Paulsen (1918-1980), had served as dean of the University of Virginia School of Law, and on the faculties of the University of Utah, University of Minnesota, Indiana University, Columbia University, University of Göttingen, and University of Freiburg.

The first dozen or so full-time Cardozo faculty members, a third of whom were women, were building a law school at Yeshiva University from scratch, establishing a law review by 1979 and designing an innovative curriculum that reflected the school's urban location in the nation's largest city. The Class of 1979 consisted of 300 students, of whom nearly half were women, reflecting the progressive agenda that had recruited women to the founding faculty. Competition for students, however, was keen, and ethnic and racial diversity difficult to achieve. Cardozo alumni from these early years reported chronically malfunctioning elevators, construction noises during bar examinations, and constant efforts to stretch resources to meet urgent needs.

Complicating this picture were the failing health and personal challenges of the founding dean, who left the Cardozo in the spring of 1980, and died in November 1981. Lester Brickman, who was 40 in the fall of 1980, and in the process of becoming a father for the second time, reluctantly accepted the acting deanship of the struggling school, admitting later that he had been carrying much of the administrative burden since his arrival. "It was very hard on the students," he reported in 2002. "We didn't have a registrar. We didn't have a business manager. The associate dean was a part-time position. We had no budget. We did not have the infrastructure of a law school."

Perhaps worst of all, the school had as yet only provisional accreditation from the American Bar Association. Brickman learned, three days before the accreditation team's site visit, that the paperwork for the crucial procedure was incomplete. He said of this later that "If we had not gotten our accreditation, or if it had been postponed, half our student body would have transferred, faculty would have left, and we would have been permanently barred from the upper echelon of law schools." A photo of Brickman taken at the 1982 celebration of the Cardozo's ABA final accreditation shows the acting dean wearing an impeccably-tailored three-piece suit and an expression of grim relief.

His emergency-management challenges were not over, however. The Cardozo's liberal origins and left-leaning faculty had attracted a significant contingent of what Brickman later called "Berkeley '60s-type students." He recounted to Gary Goldenberg in 2002 that the editors of the student newspaper "and others had decided that the law school was not sufficiently diverse." Without resources to remedy what he and other faculty recognized as a defect, Brickman responded to the student plans for a highly-publicized protest rally with the threat of a libel suit. The students backed down.

The Cardozo offered him the deanship on a permanent basis, but Brickman declined, remarking later both that he felt the school would be more successful with leadership brought in from outside, and that the acting deanship had been "an enormous strain on me personally." Monroe E. Price, a former law school faculty member of the University of California at Los Angeles, succeeded him as dean in July 1982, concluding what Gary Goldenberg dubbed "the Brickman interregnum." The overwhelming demands of the Cardozo's early struggles on Brickman's intellectual resources and personal energies are reflected in his curriculum vitae, which lists no publications at all in the years 1977 through 1987, the longest such gap in his career since his first publication as a college freshman in 1958. In 1976, Brickman's first year at the Cardozo, four publications by him had appeared, including a co-authored and edited issue of conference proceedings with Richard O. Lempert, but he published nothing further until 1988.

== Tort reform ==
=== Nonrefundable retainers ===
When Brickman was able to return to his scholarship, his next publication was his first—and successful—proposal for reform of the American legal system, and for stricter enforcement of traditional legal ethics. With his former student Lawrence A. Cunningham, at this writing (summer 2016), Henry St. George Tucker III Research Professor at George Washington University Law School, Brickman wrote a critique of what was then a relatively common, although controversial, practice by attorneys, the use of nonrefundable retainers. "A nonrefundable retainer," he and his co-author wrote, "is an agreement between lawyer and client providing for the payment of part or all of the fee in advance of the lawyer's performance. The payment is designated in the retainer agreement as nonrefundable. The dispute regarding the validity of these agreements usually arises when the client terminates the lawyer's employment without just cause before completions of the tasks and demands return of the unearned part of the advance fee." Brickman and Cunningham argued that such agreements violate the fundamental right of the client freely to discharge the attorney.

In 1993, the authors made this argument in an amici curiae brief in the Matter of Cooperman (83 NY2d 465), in which a New York lawyer named Edward M. Cooperman had been warned twice by the Grievance Committee for the Tenth Judicial District against agreements in which the lawyer demanded thousands of dollars in retainers, did little significant work, and declined to return any part of the retainers. The Appellate Division, which heard the grievance proceedings, suspended Cooperman from practice for two years. The New York State Court of Appeals, citing, among other legal authorities, Brickman and Cunningham's work on the highly questionable ethics of nonrefundable retainers, upheld the lower court's decision. Other state courts soon followed their example, despite opposition from some legal scholars and practicing attorneys. One of the latter, criminal defense attorney Scott H. Greenfield, who criticized the Cooperman decision in a 2008 blog, drew attention to Brickman's academic status, opining that the professor "never met a practicing lawyer he didn't hate."

=== Contingent fees and effective hourly rates ===
In the late 1980s and early 1990s, much of Professor Brickman's scholarship, like his critique of nonrefundable retainers, focused on ethical and economic issues associated with lawyers' fees, topics to which he was to return many times in the following decades, including in his 2011 book, Lawyer Barons. Brickman argues that plaintiff attorney fees have increased significantly over the last half-century, especially the contingent fees in class actions and mass torts, imposing substantial transaction costs on the economy, as well as incentives for fraud by attorneys and their clients. Terry Carter wrote of Professor Brickman in a 1997 article in the ABA Journal that "he is known as something of a conservative pit bull chewing on contingency fee abuse."

The traditional arguments in favor of the contingent fee system in American law are that 1) they permit access to the legal system for those who cannot afford to pay a lawyer, and 2) they provide incentives for attorneys to work diligently for plaintiffs, as they will be paid only if they win the case.

Advocates of the contingent fee argue that the lawyers' fee of 25 to 40 per cent of the recovery is necessarily high because of the risk of losing cases. Professor Brickman has asserted, in more than a dozen articles since 1989, that plaintiff attorneys generally do not accept cases that involve any meaningful risk, and that their effective hourly rates are as high as $25,000 in some cases. In a frequently-cited article published in the Washington University Law Quarterly in 2003, Brickman asserted that "Since 1960, the effective hourly rates of tort lawyers have increased 1000% to 1400% (in inflation-adjusted dollars) while the overall risk of nonrecovery has remained essentially constant—though it has decreased materially for such high-end tort categories as product liability and medical malpractice." He argues that the American Bar Association has abdicated its ethical responsibility to curb what Brickman considers to be fee-gouging and greed on the part of the plaintiff bar, especially in mass torts like asbestos litigation, and class actions of all kinds, but especially the tobacco litigation of the 1990s.

=== Asbestos litigation ===
Lester Brickman began speaking and writing about asbestos litigation in 1991, testifying on the asbestos litigation crisis before the House Committee on the Judiciary's Subcommittee on Intellectual Property and Judicial Administration. His first articles on the subject appeared in the Cardozo Law Review in 1992. Since then, he has become one of legal academe's most outspoken critics of asbestos litigation and its economic and ethical context, stating in a 2003 article in the Pepperdine Law Review that "When the complete and unexpurgated history of asbestos litigation is finally written, that litigation will surely come to be considered for entry into the pantheon of such great American scandals as the Yazoo land scandals, Credit Mobilier, Teapot Dome, Billy Sol Estis [sic], the salad oil scandals, the Savings & Loan scandals, WorldCom, and Enron."

Brickman has published (as of summer 2016) fifteen articles on asbestos litigation, and testified on the subject three times before Congressional committees (see publications list and External Links below). The subject is also addressed in his 2011 book, Lawyer Barons. In January 2005, Professor Brickman was an invited contributor to a Presidential colloquy on tort reform in asbestos litigation, with then-President George W. Bush, held at Macomb Community College, in Warren, Michigan (see External Links, below).

== Critics ==
Brickman's numerous critics and adversaries in academe and legal practice have vigorously disputed his claims regarding systemic ethical misconduct, fraud, abuse, and fee-gouging by the plaintiff bar. Prominent among these are University of Texas at Austin law professor Charles M. Silver, Herbert M. Kritzer of the University of Minnesota School of Law, the late Ronald Motley (1944-2013) of the law firm Motley Rice, Elihu Inselbuch of Caplin & Drysdale, American Bar Foundation researchers Stephen Daniels and Joanne Martin, and journalist Stephanie Mencimer.

Many of Brickman's published arguments with other scholars are enlivened by colorful rhetorical fireworks. In 2005, for example, Brickman described his three-year altercation with Charles Silver on the subject of asbestos litigation, in characteristically earthy sesquipedalian style, as a "micturating match." As Boston University law professor Susan Koniak observed in her critique of Brickman's 1994 challenge to the American Bar Association's Ethics Committee, when "Professor Brickman is not pleased," it is not unusual for "sound and fury" to be conspicuous features of his prose.

Brickman's publications have provoked considerable interest and debate among his fellow legal scholars. One of his articles on the ABA ethics controversy, for example, with the provocative title "ABA Regulation of Contingency Fees: Money Talks, Ethics Walks." has been downloaded from Law Commons more than 3700 times since it was uploaded to the site in 2011. Brickman announces his purpose on p. 249: "In this Article, I critique that Opinion [of the ABA], finding it wrong as a matter of ethics law, malevolent as a matter of public policy, disingenuous in its presentation, unfounded in the critical assumptions upon which the Opinion is based, illegitimate in its rejection of ethical considerations in favor of political partisanship, and blatantly self-interested in elevating lawyers' financial interests above their traditional fiduciary obligations to clients." This characteristically vehement and pugnacious personal style often attracts media attention to Brickman's scholarship. He is a frequent speaker at Federalist Society, Lawsuit Reform Association of New York, and other tort reform organization meetings (see External Links, below).

Brickman himself acknowledges that he is a controversial figure among legal scholars by choice, concluding an unapologetically argumentative 2005 essay in the Pepperdine Law Review with the assertion that: "This view underpins my scholarship: that identifying what is actually occurring in our legal system is, or at least ought to be, a prime purpose of scholarship; that by identifying these truths and bringing them to the attention of both the academy and the profession, I am providing an opportunity to curb abuses in the legal system; and that focusing on these abuses will ultimately be in the self-interest of the legal profession."

== Family and personal life ==
Lester Brickman married for the first time in the mid-1960s. His firstborn, and only son, Theodore K. Brickman, was born October 20, 1966. This marriage ended in divorce in March 1969. In July 1977, Brickman married Miriam Bellman, née Dorf (b. 1939), the daughter of a Toledo-born photographer, restaurateur, and realtor of Russian-Jewish ancestry, Eli Dorf (1911-1983), and Ruth Shore Dorf (1914-1986). Ruth Shore was a native of Montreal, Canada, of Romanian and Russian Jewish parentage.

Miriam Dorf Brickman was, until her retirement, a professional cook, who taught French cuisine in the New School's Culinary Arts Program, and was executive chef at the Wall Street firm Paine Webber. In January 2006, Ms. Brickman was interviewed for the International Association of Culinary Professionals' (IACP) Oral History Project by Amelia Saltsman; the transcript is held in the collections of the Schlesinger Library. She is listed in the 2011 IACP roster of Certified Culinary Professionals. Miriam Brickman died on November 3, 2020, according to her obituary in the Toledo Blade.

Lester Brickman resides in Greenwich Village and Carmel, New York. In Carmel, Lester Brickman maintains a wine cellar; he is an oenophile who has written on wine appreciation. A daughter, Frances Anna Brickman, was born to Miriam and Lester Brickman on March 5, 1981. She was educated at Choate Rosemary Hall, Smith College, and Yeshiva University's Cardozo School of Law. As of summer 2016, Anna Brickman, formerly a public defender in Boston, Massachusetts, is serving in the same capacity in Philadelphia, Pennsylvania.

In September 2005, Theodore Brickman died of melanoma in Coral Springs, Florida, at the age of 38. Lester Brickman's 2011 book, Lawyer Barons, is dedicated to his son's memory.

== Publications, in chronological order ==
With external links where available.

"Education at Marlin Boom," Carnegie Technical Magazine 22, no. 5 (April 1958): 39-42 [incomplete, last page missing]. Available from Carnegie Institute of Technology and Carnegie-Mellon University digital collections.

"The New Idea About Ideas." Carnegie Technical Magazine 23, no. 6 (May 1959): 19-21 and 35-36. Available from Carnegie Institute of Technology and Carnegie-Mellon University digital collections.

Course on Law & Poverty. [Tentative draft, May 1967]. Toledo, Ohio: University of Toledo College of Law, 1967.WorldCat permalink.

Course on Law and Poverty. 2 vols. Columbus, Ohio: State Legal Services Association, 1968. Braille edition.WorldCat permalink.

Newsletters. New York: Council on Legal Education for Professional Responsibility, 1969-1972.WorldCat permalink.

"Legal Paraprofessionalism and its Implications: Bibliography," Vanderbilt Law Review 24 (1971): 1213-32.Paid access at HeinOnline.

"Contributions of Clinical Programs to Training for Professionalism," Connecticut Law Review 4, no. 3 (Winter 1971): 437-46.Paid access at HeinOnline.

"Expansion of the Lawyering Process through a New Delivery System: The Emergence and State of Legal Paraprofessionalism," Columbia Law Review 71, no. 7 (Nov. 1971): 1153-255.JSTOR.

"Review: Training for the Public Professions of the Law, 1971; a Report to the Association of American Law Schools," University of Illinois Law Forum 1972, no. 4 (1972): 843-54.

"Of Arterial Passageways through the Legal Process: The Right of Universal Access to Courts and Lawyering Services," New York University Law Review 48, no. 4 (Oct. 1973): 595-668.Paid access at Hein Online.

Training for the Public Professions of the Law, 1971; a Report to the Association of American Law Schools. Champaign, Ill.: College of Law, University of Illinois at Urbana-Champaign, 1973. WorldCat permalink.

"CLEPR and Clinical Education: A Review and Analysis," In Clinical Education for the Law Student; Legal Education in a Service Setting. New York: Council on Legal Education for Professional Responsibility, 1973: 56-93.Abstract. WorldCat permalink, with analytics.

Clinical Work in the First and Second Year of Law School. New York: Council on Legal Education for Professional Responsibility, 1973. WorldCat permalink.

"Legal Delivery Systems: A Bibliography," University of Toledo Law Review 4 (1973): 465-552. Paid access at HeinOnline.

"The Blade Readers' Forum: Editorial Called Naive on Arab Intentions," Toledo Blade, December 31, 1973: 6.

"Legal Services in the 70's: The Shape of the Future," University of Toledo Law Review 4 (1973): 361.Paid access at HeinOnline.

Clinical Education and the Legal Paraprofessional. New York: Council on Legal Education for Professional Responsibility, 1974.WorldCat permalink.

Group Legal Services and Clinical Legal Education. New York: Council on Legal Education for Professional Responsibility, 1974.WorldCat permalink.

With Steven Leleiko. Clinical Education: The Student Perspective. New York: Council on Legal Education for Professional Responsibility, 1974.WorldCat permalink.

With Frederick H. Zemans. Clinical Legal Education and Legal Aid: The Canadian Experience. New York: Council on Legal Education for Professional Responsibility, 1974.WorldCat permalink.

Cases and Materials for a Course in Legal Ethics and the Legal Profession. Toledo: University of Toledo, College of Law, 1975.WorldCat permalink.

"It's Time to End Blanket Restrictions on Legal Advertising." Bar Leader 1, no. 2 (May–June 1975): 18-20.

"Advertising: A Business Technique for Lawyers? Paper Delivered to the 1975 Annual Meeting of the Virginia State Bar Association." Virginia Bar News 24 (1975): 15-21.

"Evaluation: Needs and Techniques, and "An Outline for Evaluation of a Full Time Legal Aid Law Office," in Conference on Legal Aid: Report and Proceedings, edited by Ian Rose. Ottawa: Canadian Council on Social Development, 1975: 65-76.WorldCat permalink.

"Should Lawyers Be Permitted to Advertise? Yes, But ...". Bar Leader 1 (May–June 1975): 18-19.

With Roderick N. Petry and Arthur M. Lewis. Ensuring Quality Legal Assistance for the General Public: The Role of Specialization in the Legal Profession. Washington D.C: Special Committee on Specialization, American Bar Association, 1975.

"The Education and Licensing of Lawyers: Current Proposals to Improve the Competency of Lawyers," in The Education and Licensing of Lawyers, edited by Norman Redlich. New York: Council on Legal Education for Professional Responsibility, 1976. Reprint, Learning and the Law v.3 no.2 (Summer 1976).WorldCat permalink.

"In the Halls of Ivy: Legal Robots," Learning and the Law 3, no. 2 (1976): 14-15.Paid access at HeinOnline.

"Legal Specialization: An Overview of Goals and Ethical Considerations," in Working Papers for the National Conference on Legal Specialization: June 13–14, 1975, American Bar Center, Chicago Illinois, edited by Roderick N. Petry and American Bar Association, Special Committee on Specialization: American Bar Association, 1976 5-19. Reprint 45 South Carolina Law Review (1994): 1056.WorldCat permalink.

With Richard O. Lempert. The Role of Research in the Delivery of Legal Services: Working Papers and Conference Proceedings. Washington: Resource Center for Consumers of Legal Services, 1976.Limited preview.

With Richard O. Lempert. "Foreword," Law & Society Review 11, no. 2 (1976): 167-69.

With Richard O. Lempert. "Transcript of Conference Proceedings," Law & Society Review 11, no. 2 (1976): 319-86..

With Lawrence A. Cunningham. "Nonrefundable Retainers: Impermissible under Fiduciary, Statutory and Contract Law," Fordham Law Review 57, no. 2 (November 1988): 149-90.

"Contingent Fees without Contingencies: Hamlet without the Prince of Denmark?" UCLA Law Review 37, no. 1 (October 1989): 29-138.Paid access at HeinOnline.

"Dedication to Karl Krastin," Nova Law Review 14, no. 1 (Fall 1989): 3-6.Paid access at HeinOnline.

"Advance Fee Payment Dilemma: Should Payments Be Deposited to the Client Trust Account or the General Office Account?" Cardozo Law Review 10, no. 4 (February 1989): 647-76.Paid access at HeinOnline.

"Attorney-Client Fee Arbitration: A Dissenting View." Utah Law Review 1990, no. 2 (1990): 277-308.Paid access at HeinOnline.

"A Massachusetts Debacle: Gagnon v Shoblom." Cardozo Law Review 13, no. 6 (April 1991): 1417-30.Paid access at HeinOnline.

"Attorneys at Law." Warren's Weed New York Real Property 1 (1991): 1-99.WorldCat permalink.

With John M. Bibona. "Collateral Estoppel as a Basis for Attorney Discipline: The Next Step," Georgetown Journal of Legal Ethics 5, no. 1 (1991): 1-33.WorldCat permalink.

"Setting the Fee When the Client Discharges a Contingent Fee Attorney," Emory Law Journal 41, no. 2 (Spring 1992): 367-402.Paid access at LexisNexis.

"Asbestos Claims Management Act of 1991: A Proposal to the United States Congress," Cardozo Law Review 13, no. 6 (April 1992): 1891-918.Point of Law.

"Asbestos Litigation Crisis: Is There a Need for an Administrative Alternative?" Cardozo Law Review 13, no. 6 (April 1992): 1819-90.Point of Law.

"Has the Office of Thrift Supervision Changed the Relevant Ethics Rules by Its Actions in the Kaye, Scholer Matter?" In The Attorney-Client Relationship after Kaye, Scholer, edited by Jonathan J. Lerner. Corporate Law and Practice Course Handbook Series no. 779. New York: Practising Law Institute, 1992: 79-91.WorldCat permalink.

"Keeping Quiet in the Face of Fraud." Los Angeles Times, March 12, 1992, A 11.

With Jonathan Klein. "Use of Advance Fee Attorney Retainer Agreements in Bankruptcy: Another Special Law for Lawyers," South Carolina Law Review 43, no. 4 (Summer 1992): 1037-102. paid access at HeinOnline.

"After Asbestos, the Next Tort-Law Fiasco." Wall Street Journal, October 21, 1993, A17 col. 4; reprinted in Issues of Injury (1993).

With Lawrence A. Cunningham. "Nonrefundable Retainers Revisited." North Carolina Law Review 72, no. 1 (1993): 1..

"On the Relevance of the Admissibility of Scientific Evidence: Tort System Outcomes are Principally Determined by Lawyers' Rates of Return," Cardozo Law Review 15, no. 6 (April 1994): 1755-98.Paid access at LexisNexis.

"Limiting Lawyers' Unearned Windfall Fees," New York Law Journal (August 4, 1994): 5.WorldCat permalink

With Lawrence A. Cunningham. "Living with the Ban on Nonrefundable Retainers: Cooperman's Scope, Meaning and Consequences." New York State Bar Journal 66, no. 6 (1994): 50.

With Michael J. Horowitz, and Jeffrey O'Connell. Rethinking Contingency Fees: A Proposal to Align the Contingency Fee System with its Policy Roots and Ethical Mandates. Studies for the New American Century. Washington, D.C.: Manhattan Institute, 1994.JSTOR.

"Foster's Papers: What Executive Privilege?" New York Times, August 2, 1995, A19.

"Does America Need Tort Reform? Yes, to Curb Lawyers' Greed," New York Daily News, May 5, 1995, 33.

With Lawrence A. Cunningham. "Nonrefundable Retainers: A Response to Critics of the Absolute Ban." University of Cincinnati Law Review 64, no. 1 (1995): 11.Abstract.

"ABA Regulation of Contingency Fees: Money Talks, Ethics Walks," Fordham Law Review 65, no. 1 (1996): 247.

"Contingency Fee Abuses, Ethical Mandates, and the Disciplinary System: The Case against Case-by-Case Enforcement," Washington and Lee Law Review 53, no. 4 (1996): 1339-80.

"Curb Legal Feeding Frenzy," USA Today, January 10, 1996, 11A.

"Contingency Fees: A Peril to Nation's Health," Corpus Christi Caller Times, August 22, 1997.

Class Action Reform: Beyond Rhone-Poulenc Rorer. Manhattan Institute Research Memorandum, No. 10, Oct. 1995. New York: Manhattan Institute for Policy Research, 1997.

With Lawrence A. Cunningham. "Game Theory and Nonrefundable Retainers: A Response to Professors Croson and Mnookin," Harvard Negotiation Law Review 2 (1997): 69-86. Paid access at HeinOnline.

With Charles Silver. "Contingency Fees -- Should Plaintiffs' Lawyers in the Tobacco Settlement Receive Billions of Dollars?" Cardozo Law Review 83, no. 9 (September 1997): 74-75; reprint " ABA Journal 83, no. 9 (1997): 74-75. Paid access at HeinOnline.

"Want to Be a Billionaire? Sue a Tobacco Company," Wall Street Journal, December 30, 1998, A10.

"Will Legal Ethics Go up in Smoke?" Wall Street Journal, June 16, 1998, A18.

"Ethics Go up in Smoke." Legal Times, March 9, 1998, 33.

With Ronald Rotunda. "When Witnesses Are Told What to Say." Washington Post, January 13, 1998, A15.

"Regulation by Litigation: The New Wave of Government Sponsored Litigation, Remarks at Manhattan Institute and U.S. Chamber of Commerce Conference, June 22." 1999.

"Lawyers' Ethics and Fiduciary Obligation in the Brave New World of Aggregative Litigation," William and Mary Environmental Law & Policy Review 26, no. 2 (Winter 2001): 243-322.

"Mandatory Fee Arbitration under New York's Matrimonial Rule." Cardozo Journal of Conflict Resolution 3 (2001): 1-67.Abstract.

"Lawyers Put Profit above People." New York Post, June 27, 2001, 33.

"The James Gang Robbed Banks. Today's Lawyers Have a Better Idea." St. Louis Post-Dispatch, April 27, 2001, C17.

"Asbestos Litigation: Malignancy in the Courts?" In Civil Justice Forum 10. New York NY: Center for Legal Policy at the Manhattan Institute, 2002.

Anatomy of a Madison County (Illinois) Class Action: A Study of Pathology. New York, N.Y.: Center for Legal Policy at the Manhattan Institute, 2002.Abstract

"Response of Lester Brickman to Elihu Inselbuch, 'Contingent Fees and Tort Reform: A Reassessment and Reality Check.'" Law and Contemporary Problems 65, no. 2 (2002): 295..

"Effective Hourly Rates of Contingency-Fee Lawyers: Competing Data and Non-Competitive Fees." Washington University Law Quarterly 81, no. 3 (2003): 653.

"Symposium: Ethics 2000 and Beyond: Reform or Professional Responsibility as Usual? The Continuing Assault on the Citadel of Fiduciary Protection: Ethics 2000's Revision of Model Rule 1.5." University of Illinois Law Review no. 5 (2003): 1181.Paid access at Hein Online.

"On the Theory Class's Theories of Asbestos Litigation: The Disconnect between Scholarship and Reality." Pepperdine Law Review 31, no. 1 (2003): 33-170.Abstract.

"Market for Contingent Fee-Financed Tort Litigation: Is It Price Competitive?" Cardozo Law Review 25, no. 1 (November 2003): 65-128.Abstract.

"The Great Asbestos Swindle." Wall Street Journal (January 6, 2003): A18.

"Making Lawyers Compete - Is the Market for Contingent Fee-Financed Tort Litigation Competitive?" Regulation 27, no. 2 (2004): 30.Abstract.

With Harvey D. Shapiro. ""Early Offers:"a Proposal to Counter Attorney Fee Gouging by Aligning the Contingent Fee System with Its Policy Roots and Ethical Mandates," PointofLaw.com (August 17, 2004).

"Ethical Issues in Asbestos Litigation." Hofstra Law Review 33 (Summer 2005): 833-912.Abstract.

"Analysis of the Financial Impact of S. 852: The Fairness in Asbestos Injury Resolution Act of 2005." Cardozo Law Review 27, no. 2 (November 2005): 991-1034.Abstract.

"Comments on NIOSH's Proposed B Reader Code of Ethics." 2005. White paper available on SSRN.

"What Did Those X-Rays Really Show?" Wall Street Journal, November 5, 2005, A9.

With Harvey D. Shapiro. "Asbestos Kills - and More Than Just People: Jobs, Ethics, and Elementary Justice," National Review 57, no. 1 (2005): 39.

"On the Applicability of the Silica MDL Proceeding to Asbestos Litigation." Connecticut Insurance Law Journal 12 (2005/2006): 289-314.Abstract.

"False Witness." Wall Street Journal, December 2–3, 2006, A9.

"Disparities between Asbestosis and Silicosis Claims Generated by Litigation Screenings and Clinical Studies." Cardozo Law Review 29, no. 2 (November 2007): 513-622.Abstract.

"DOJ's Free Pass for Tort Fraud." Wall Street Journal, December 26, 2007, A 11.

"Contingency-Fee Con Men." Wall Street Journal, September 25, 2007, A18.

"The Use of Litigation Screenings in Mass Torts: A Formula for Fraud?" Southern Methodist University Law Review 61 (2008): 1221-354.Abstract.

"No Recession for Tort Lawyers." Forbes (July 23, 2009).

"Unmasking the Powerful Force That Has Mis-Shaped the American Civil Justice System." Global Competition Litigation Review 4, no. 3 (2010): 169-73.Abstract.

Lawyer Barons: What Their Contingency Fees Really Cost America. Cambridge and New York: Cambridge University Press, 2011.. Introductory chapter

"Anatomy of an Aggregate Settlement: The Triumph of Temptation over Ethics," Cardozo Law Review 79, no. 2 (February 2011): 700-16.Abstract

"Fraud and Abuse in Mesothelioma Litigation," Tulane Law Review 88 (2014): 1072-152.Abstract.

"In the BP Case, the Rule of Law Is on Trial." The Hill (November 10, 2014).

"The BP Oil Spill and the Rule of Law (or the Rule of Lawyers)." Washington Times, 2014. Reprinted in the Brazil Sun, November 20, 2014.

== Testimony, expert reports, and amicus curiae briefs ==
Chronological order.

Brickman, Lester. "Statement of Lester Brickman." In Asbestos Litigation Crisis in Federal and State Courts: Hearings before the Subcommittee on Intellectual Property and Judicial Administration of the Committee on the Judiciary, House of Representatives, One Hundred Second Congress, First and Second Sessions, October 24, 1991, February 26 and 27, 1992. United States. Congress. House. Committee on the Judiciary. Subcommittee on Intellectual Property and Judicial Administration. Washington: U.S. G.P.O., 1993.WorldCat permalink.

Amicus brief in Dunn V. Hovic, 1 F.3d 1371 (3rd Cir. 1993) on behalf of the American Tort Reform Association, 1993.

With Lawrence Cunningham, Amicus brief in Matter of Cooperman, 83 N.Y.2d 465 (N.Y. Court of Appeals 1993, (1993).

Amicus brief in Cimino V. Pittsburgh Corning, Inc., 151 F.3d 297 (5th Cir. 1998), filed in 1994 on behalf of the American Tort Reform Association (1994).

Brickman, Lester. "Statement of Lester Brickman, April 30, 1997." In Product Liability Reform: Hearings before the Subcommittee on Telecommunications, Trade, and Consumer Protection of the Committee on Commerce, House of Representatives, One Hundred Fifth Congress, First Session, April 8, 1997. United States. Congress. House. Committee on Commerce. Subcommittee on Telecommunications Trade and Consumer Protection. Washington: U.S. G.P.O., 1997.

Brickman, Lester. "Statement of Lester Brickman." In Contingency Fee Abuses: Hearing before the Committee on the Judiciary, United States Senate, One Hundred Fourth Congress, First Session, on Examining Certain Contingency Fee Abuses and Their Effect on the Tort System, November 7, 1995. United States. Congress. Senate. Committee on the Judiciary. Washington: U.S. G.P.O., 1997.

Brickman, Lester. "Statement of Lester Brickman." In Attorneys' Fees and the Tobacco Settlement: Hearing before the Subcommittee on Courts and Intellectual Property of the Committee on the Judiciary, House of Representatives, One Hundred Fifth Congress, First Session ... December 10, 1997. United States. Congress. House. Committee on the Judiciary. Subcommittee on Courts and Intellectual Property. Washington: U.S. G.P.O., 1999.

Amicus brief in Int'l Precious Metals et al. V. Waters, et al., 120 S. Ct. 2237 (in Support of Certiorari Petition to U.S. Supreme Court, June 5, 2000), 2000.

Brickman, Lester. "Letter (Testimony) to ABA Ethics 2000 Commission Hearing, New Orleans, LA, March 23." 2000..

Brickman, Lester. "Written Statement of Lester Brickman, Professor of Law, Benjamin N. Cardozo School of Law of Yeshiva University." In Administration of Large Business Bankruptcy Reorganizations: Has Competition for Big Cases Corrupted the Bankruptcy System? Hearing before the Subcommittee on Commercial and Administrative Law of the Committee on the Judiciary, House of Representatives, One Hundred Eighth Congress, Second Session, July 21, 2004. U.S. Congress. House Committee on the Judiciary. Subcommittee on Commercial and Administrative Law. Washington: U.S. G.P.O., 2004.

Brickman, Lester. "Testimony of Lester Brickman, Benjamin N. Cardozo Distinguished Professor of Law, Yeshiva University, New York, NY: Has Competition for Big Cases Corrupted the Bankruptcy System?" In Oversight Hearing on the Administration of Large Business Bankruptcy Reorganizations. 108th Congress, July 21, 2004. United States. Congress. House. Committee on the Judiciary. Subcommittee on Commercial and Administrative Law. Washington, DC: U.S. Government Publishing Office, 2004..

Brickman, Lester. "Testimony on the Proposed Fair Act and the Effect of Mass Filings of Silicosis Claims." In Asbestos: Mixed Dust and FELA Issues: Hearing before the Committee on the Judiciary, United States Senate, One Hundred Ninth Congress, First Session, February 2, 2005. United States. Congress. Senate. Committee on the Judiciary, 44-70. Washington: U.S. G.P.O., 2006.

Brickman, Lester. "Written Statement of Lester Brickman, Professor of Law, Benjamin N. Cardozo School of Law." In How Fraud and Abuse in the Asbestos Compensation System Affect Victims, Jobs, the Economy, and the Legal System: Hearing before the Subcommittee on the Constitution of the Committee on the Judiciary, House of Representatives, One Hundred Twelfth Congress, First Session, September 9, 2011. United States. Congress. House. Committee on the Judiciary. Subcommittee on the Constitution., 4-40. Washington: U.S. G.P.O., 2011.

Brickman, Lester. Expert Report of Lester Brickman, Esq., Benjamin Cardozo School of Law, In Re Garlock Sealing Technologies LLC, et al., Case No. 10-Bk-31607, April 23, 2013. 2013..

Amicus brief in Republic of Argentina v. NML Capitol, Ltd., 695 F.3d 201 (2d Cir. 2012), Cert. Granted, 134 S.Ct. 895, Jan. 10, 2013 Affirmed, 134 S.Ct. 2250, U.S., June 2014, Filed April 2, 2014, 695 (2014)..

Brickman, Lester. "Testimony of Lester Brickman, Benjamin N. Cardozo Distinguished Professor of Law, Yeshiva University, New York, NY," in Furthering Asbestos Claim Transparency (FACT) Act of 2015: Hearing before the Subcommittee on Regulatory Reform, Commercial and Antitrust Law of the Committee on the Judiciary, House of Representatives, One Hundred Fourteenth Congress, First Session, on H.R. 526, February 4, 2015. United States. Congress. House. Committee on the Judiciary. Subcommittee on Regulatory Reform Commercial and Antitrust Law, 66-107. Washington, DC: U.S. Government Publishing Office, 2015.. Video

Amicus brief in Joshua Blackman v. Amber Gascho, U.S. Supreme Court No. 16-364 (in Support of Certiorari Petition to U.S. Supreme Court, October 21, 2016).

== Selected citations in cases ==
Chronological order, with links where available.

Superior Court of New Jersey, Appellate Division, Cohen v. Radio-Electronics Officers Union, 275 N.J. Super. 241, at 265 and 266 (1994).

U.S. District Court for the Eastern District of New York, Kin Cheung Wong v. Kennedy, No. CV-93-5519, 853 F. Supp. 79, at 80, decided May 23, 1994.

U.S. District Court for the Southern District of New York, In re Joint Eastern & Southern District Asbestos Litigation, 878 F. Supp. 473, at 558, 559, 561, decided January 19, 1995.

U.S. Bankruptcy Court, M.D. Pennsylvania, Wilkes-Barre Division, In re: Gray's Run Technologies,Bankruptcy Nos. 5-96-02395, 5-96-02400, 5-96-02420, 217 B.R. 48 at 52 and 55, decided November 19, 1997.

U.S. District Court, Southern District of New York, Kelly v. MD Buyline, 2 F. Supp.2d 420 at 445-47, 449-50, decided March 31, 1998.

Iowa Supreme Court, Board of Professional Ethics and Conduct v. G. Richard Apland, No. 97-2297, decided April 22, 1998.

U.S. District Court, Southern District of New York,Levisohn, Lerner, Berger & Langsam v. Medical Taping Systems, Inc., 20 F. Supp. 2d 645, decided September 23, 1998.

Supreme Court of South Carolina,In re Miles, No. 24949, 516 S.E.2d 661, at 664, decided June 1, 1999.

U.S. District Court, Southern District of New York, Schweizer v. Mulvehill, No. 95 CIV. 10743 MGCMHD, 93 F. Supp. 376, decided March 31, 2000.

Civil Court, City of New York, Queens County,Agusta & Ross v. Trancamp Contracting Corporation, 751 N.Y.S. 2d 155, at 158, decided November 21, 2002.

Northern District of Ohio, In re: Sulzer Hip Prosthesis and Knee Prosthesis Liability Litigation, No. 1:01-CV-9000, 290 F. Supp.2d 840, at 851 n.13, decided October 31, 2003)

U.S. Appeals Court, 4th Circuit,Kress v. Food Employers Labor Relations Association, 391 F.3d 563, at 570, decided December 10, 2004.

U.S.District Court, Eastern District of New York, In re Zyprexa Products Liability Litigation, 424 F. Supp. 2d 488 at 494, 496, decided March 28, 2006.

State of Michigan Attorney Discipline Board v. Cooper, Case No. 06-36-GA at 25, decided September 17, 2007.

United States District Court, Northern District of Oklahoma. McQueen, Rains & Tresch LLP v. CITGO Petroleum Corporation, 07-CV-0314-CVE-PJC, 2008 WL 199895 at 9, decided Jan. 22, 2008.

U.S. District Court, Central District of California, Fernandez v. Victoria's Secret Stores, LLC, Case No. CV 06-04149 MMM (SHx), decided July 21, 2008, at 27.

Supreme Court of Tennessee, at Knoxville, Doug Satterfield v. Breeding Insulation Co. et al., 266 S.W.3d 347 at n.50 (Tenn.), decided September 9, 2008.

Louisiana Court of Appeals, 2nd Circuit, Skannal v. Jones Odom Davis & Politz, L.L.P., 124 So. 3d 500 at 513, decided September 25, 2013.

U.S. District Court, Southern District of California,Riddle v. National Rail Road Passenger Corporation (AMTRAK), Civil No.3:14-CV-01231-JLS (WVG), WL 5783825 at 5, decided November 5, 2014.

Minnesota Supreme Court, David v. Bartel Enterprises, No. A13-2141, W.C.C.A. No. WC13-5567856; N.W. 2d 271, at 276, decided November 26, 2014..

Northern District of Texas, Campbell Harrison & Dagley, L.L.P. v. Hill, No. 3:12-CV-4599-L, 2014 WL 2207211, at 14, decided May 28, 2014, affirmed in part, reversed in part, 782 F.3d 240 (5th Cir. 2015).

U.S. District Court, Northern District of California, Davis v. Cole Haan, Case No. 11-CV-01826-JSW, decided November 12, 2015 at 5.

Pennsylvania Superior Court, Angino & Rovner v. Jeffrey R. Lessin & Associates, A. 3d 502, WL 81848 at 4, decided Jan. 5, 2016.

Supreme Court of the State of Delaware, Genuine Parts Company v. Cepec, C.A. No. N15C-02-184, decided April 18, 2016, note 122.
