= Center for Justice & Democracy =

- Formation: 1998
- Type: Nonprofit organization
- Key people: Joanne Doroshow, Executive Director
- Website: www.centerjd.org

Center for Justice & Democracy (CJ&D) is a non-profit consumer rights organization exclusively dedicated to educating the public about the importance of the U.S. civil justice system and fighting tort reform.

== History ==
The Center for Justice & Democracy was founded in 1998 by Joanne Doroshow, with the help of other consumer advocates, including Ralph Nader. In November 2011, New York Law School and the Center for Justice and Democracy formed an affiliation to begin during the fall 2011 semester; during this affiliation, CJ&D was known as the Center for Justice and Democracy at New York Law School.

CJ&D has published numerous studies and White Papers as well as fact sheets on a variety of civil justice issues. CJ&D has presented testimony before Congress and state legislatures, and has helped organize press events advocating the rights of injured consumers and patients.
