= Garlock Sealing Technologies =

American manufacturing company

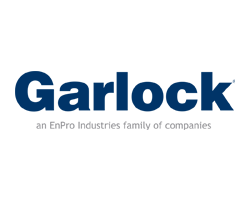
- Company type: Subsidiary of Enpro
- Industry: Manufacturing
- Founded: Palmyra, New York, US (1887)
- Founder: Olin J. Garlock
- Headquarters: Palmyra, New York, US
- Products: Gasketing, Klozure Dynamic Seals, Hydraulic Components, Expansion Joints, Compression Packing
- Website: www.garlock.com

Garlock Sealing Technologies is a subsidiary of Enpro Company that produces sealing products. Garlock has a global presence, with 1,887 employees, at 14 facilities, in twelve countries.

== History ==
In the later nineteenth century, Olin J. Garlock devised a better way to seal piston rods in industrial steam engines. The invention led to the creation of Garlock Sealing Technologies. Founded in 1887, in Palmyra, New York. For a detailed history of Garlock from its founding in 1887 until the takeover by Colt Industries in 1976, see Garlock - The First Eighty-Eight Years 1887-1975, written by Robert M. Waples and son. (Waples was President then Chairman 1955-1960)

== Industries ==
Garlock provides fluid sealing solutions for the following industries: petrochemical, chemical processing, and refining, pulp and paper, power generation, electronics, steel mills, food and pharmaceutical, mining and original equipment manufacturers.

== Patented products ==
Some of Garlock's sealing products include KLOZURE oil seals, bearing isolators and mechanical seals; GYLON gasketing, CEFIL'AIR pneumatic seals and HELICOFLEX metal seals; sheet rubber products, valve and pump packing, hydraulic seals, molded rubber products, expansion joints, butterfly valves, LubriKup oil seals, pump diaphragms and THERMa-PUR high temperature material. Some of these products have US and International patent protection, including Australia.

== Partnerships and recent news ==
- The Timken Company - A supply agreement that will increase global sales for KLOZURE oil seals and bearing isolators.
- Nippon Valqua - A strategic alliance, with Garlock enjoying exclusive sales rights for Nippon Valqua products in the Americas and Nippon Valqua having exclusive sales rights for Garlock products in Japan, South Korea and Taiwan.
- In 2007, Garlock expanded by leasing over 6000 m2 in Portwall Distribution Center II.

== Litigation ==
=== Gore-Tex ===
In the 1970s, Garlock infringed W. L. Gore and Associates patents and was sued by Gore in the Federal District Court of Ohio. After a "bitterly contested case" that "involved over two years of discovery, five weeks of trial, the testimony of 35 witnesses (19 live, 16 by deposition), and over 300 exhibits," (quoting the Federal Circuit) the District Court held Gore's patents to be invalid. On appeal, however, the Federal Circuit disagreed in the famous case of Gore v. Garlock, reversing the lower court's decision on the ground, inter alia, that Cropper forfeited any superior claim to the invention by virtue of having concealed the process for making ePTFE from the public, thereby establishing Gore as the legal inventor.

=== Asbestos ===
Garlock has been subject to multiple lawsuits regarding asbestos, which were components of earlier products. Now, Garlock produces only asbestos free products. Some of the notable suits include:

- Donald Reynolds, who worked at the Ashland Oil refinery in Tonawanda for more than 35 years, was diagnosed with malignant mesothelioma, an incurable lung disease, in 2003. Reynolds and his wife filed this personal injury action against 20 defendants, including Garlock Sealing Technologies LLC and Niagara Insulations, Inc., alleging that his disease was the result of workplace exposure to asbestos. By the time the trial was held in 2004, the only remaining defendants were Garlock, which provided the refinery with asbestos-containing pump gaskets and packing, and Niagara, which provided asbestos containing pipe insulation.
- Buddy Jones worked at Newport News Shipbuilding (now Northrop Grumman Newport News) for several years in the 1960s. After that he became a computer programmer in Richmond. In late 2004, he became ill and was first diagnosed with pneumonia. Later, there were tumors found in Jones' lungs. The Newport News Circuit Court verdict in Wanda Jones' wrongful death lawsuit against three companies that manufactured the materials used at Newport News Shipbuilding was handed down on July 26, 2006.
- Vaughn Oney was sometimes in contact with asbestos daily between 1963 and 1973. Mr. Oney retired in 1994 when he was in his early fifties and was in good health, but was diagnosed with mesothelioma in 2004. A verdict was awarded by a jury in State Circuit Court in Virginia in the amount of US$9.25 million for his death.
- In a landmark January 2014 decision in the case In re Garlock Sealing Technologies, LLC, a U.S. bankruptcy judge set Garlock’s liability for all present and future claims at $125 million, a fraction of the $1.4 billion plaintiff lawyers sought. Soon after the trial commencing on 22 July 2013, the judge ordered the courtroom closed to the public due to concerns about fraud. The decision considered over 4000 mesothelioma claimants who had sued Garlock prior to its bankruptcy filing, and also an unknown number of victims who will develop mesothelioma in the future.

== See also ==
- In re Garlock Sealing Technologies, LLC
