= ULC =

ULC may refer to:

- Uniform Law Commission, a non-profit American unincorporated organization that produces draft legislation
- Unit labor cost, another term for a wage
- Unlimited Liability Corporation, a Canadian corporation designation
- Union de Luttes Communistes, a former Communist party in the country now known as Burkina Faso
- University of Las Condes, a Chilean private university existing from 1987 to 1999
- Universal Life Church, a non-denominational religious organization founded in 1962
- Universal Life Church Monestary, a non-denominatioal religious organization founded in 1977
- Urban Land Conservancy, a Denver-based nonprofit established in 2003
- Urząd Lotnictwa Cywilnego, the Civil Aviation Office of Poland
- Underwriters' Laboratories of Canada
- BCCM/ULC, a cyanobacteria collection part of the Belgian Co-ordinated Collections of Micro-organisms
- ULC, National Rail code for Ulceby railway station, North Lincolnshire, England
