= Mario Schilling =

Chilean lawyer (b. 1969)

Mario Schilling Fuenzalida
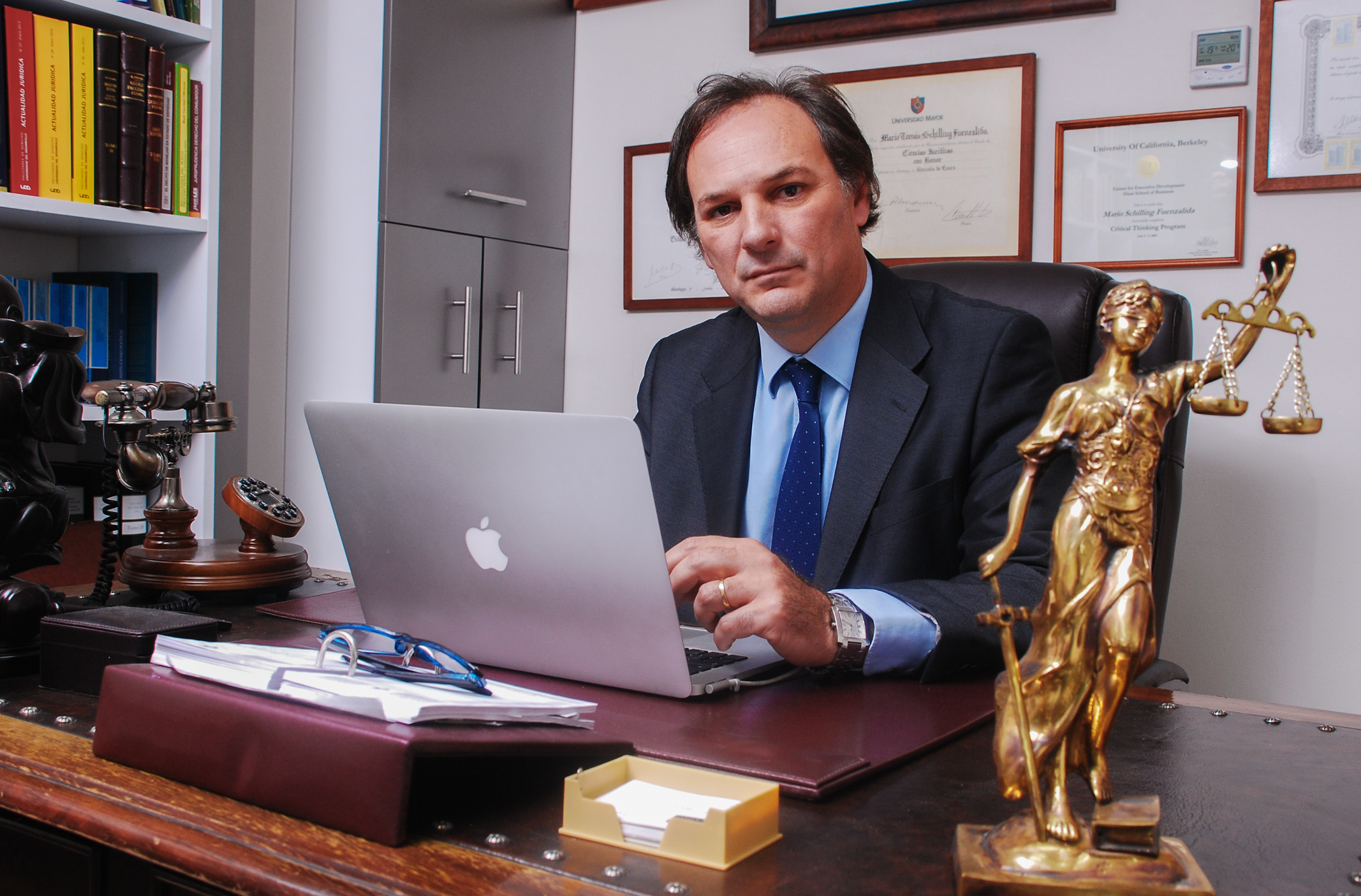
- Schilling in 2015
- Born: Mario Tomás Schilling Fuenzalida; 9 March 1969 (age 57); Santiago, Chile
- Education: University of Las Condes; Major University; Adolfo Ibáñez University; University of Chile
- Occupations: Lawyer, journalist, columnist, philosopher

Mario Tomás Schilling Fuenzalida (born 9 March 1969) is a Chilean lawyer, journalist, columnist and philosopher, popular for his media presence as a spokesman for the Eastern Prosecutor's Office in Santiago and as a panelist for the television programs Consciencia de Valores and Camino al Futuro on Tendencias Prime Chile channel, in addition to his participation in the channels UCV Televisión and Vive.

== Early life and education ==
Schilling was born on March 9, 1969, in Santiago, to his parents Mario Fernando Schilling Besoaín and María Bernardita Fuenzalida Rioseco. He studied at the Verbo Divino school in Santiago and at the Sagrados Corazones, Padres Franceses and Saint Paul's School, both in Viña del Mar. Later, he studied Journalism at the University of Las Condes (now Universidad del Desarrollo de Santiago) and Law at the Major University. In regards to his legal education, he studied at the Adolfo Ibáñez University for a master's degree in Tributary Management.

He graduated from the University of Chile with a master's degree in Philosophy. He submitted a thesis on the Epistemology of Social Sciences regarding the teachings of Mario Bunge and his research was co-directed by the aforementioned philosopher from McGill University, Montreal, Canada. In 2009 he obtained his Ph.D. in Philosophy at the University of Chile. His thesis on the Ethical Aspects of the New Criminal Law of the Enemy was published by Publitecnia Press.

Schilling was certified in the Critical Thinking Program by the University of California, Berkeley, United States. As a Doctor of Philosophy, Schilling was trained in Logic-Based Therapy by the National Philosophical Counseling Association and certified in the United States by its founder.

== Career ==
=== As columnist and panelist ===
In 1988, Schilling entered the Literary Workshop of the poet Alejandra de Groote, meeting place of the main writers and poets of the region of Valparaíso in the 1980s. In September 1989, Schilling became a columnist in the newspaper El Mercurio de Valparaíso in the Arts and Culture section, analyzing the narrative scene of the time.

In 1991, he joined the team of reviewers in the book section of El Mercurio, where he published work continuously until 2002. He also collaborated for the magazine Ercilla, as a columnist of the book section, under the pseudonym of Max Demian.

In 2010, he participated as columnist for El Mostrador and panelist in the radio programs Buenos días mercado in Radio El Conquistador and Palabras sacan palabras in Radio Futuro. At the end of the decade, Schilling – along with Agustín Zamora, host of the program Consciencia de Valores – participated in several seasons in the channels UCV Televisión, Vive and Tendencias Prime Chile. On Tendencias Prime Chile, Schilling hosted the program Camino al Futuro.

=== As spokesman for the Eastern Prosecutor's Office and candidate for deputy ===
Between 2002 and 2011, Schilling served as Communicational Advisor to the Public Prosecutor's Office obtaining this position after a public competition. During his first term in the Araucanía Public Prosecutor's Office, he trained a lawyer as spokesperson for the entity and was in charge of the public opinion management of the repartition.

Subsequently, in 2005, with the experience acquired in the ninth region, Schilling obtained an appointment decree to act as communications advisor to regional prosecutor Xavier Armendáriz after winning, again, a public competition. From 2005 to 2011, while serving as spokesman for the Eastern Prosecutor's Office, he had high media exposure, being interviewed several times.

Schilling was a candidate for deputy in the 2013 parliamentary elections for the 22nd district (Santiago Centro) as an independent candidate for the electoral coalition Si tu quieres, Chile cambia (If you want, Chile changes), getting the fourth place with 5,468 votes. After that candidacy, he did not continue to participate in politics.

== Published works ==
- 1988 – Negociación: solución extrajudicial de conflictos privados. Conosur Press, Santiago, Chile.
- 1999 – Métodos alternativos de resolución de conflictos. Conosur Press, Santiago, Chile.
- 2002 – Manual de mediación (First edition). Cuatrovientos Press, Santiago, Chile.
- 2002 – Manual de negociación. La Ley Press, Santiago, Chile.
- 2009 – Manual de mediación (Second extended edition). Cuatrovientos Press, Santiago, Chile.
- 2009 – El Nuevo Derecho Penal del Enemigo. Librotecnia Press, Santiago, Chile.
- 2019 – Mejor llama a Sócrates. Cuando ir al psicólogo no es tu solución. Houston, United States.
- 2019 – You Better Call Socrates (English version). Houston, United States.
- 2020 - Diccionario de emociones. CHC Press, Santiago, Chile. (ISBN 978-956-6084-02-0)
- 2020 - La lógica de las emociones y los engaños de la mente. CHC Press, Santiago de Chile. (ISBN 978-956-6084-01-3)
- 2020 - Los 50 engaños de la mente: Falacias, sesgos, ilusiones y prejuicios. CHC Press, Santiago, Chile.
- 2021 - ¿Qué debemos hacer ante situaciones negativas? 50 enseñanzas de la filosofía estoica. CHC Press, Santiago, Chile.
- 2021 - ¿Cómo enfrentar las adversidades? 50 enseñanzas de la filosofía estoica. CHC Press, Santiago, Chile.
- 2021 - Breve manual de antropología filosófica. CHC Press, Santiago, Chile.

== Electoral record ==
2013 Parliamentary District 22 Deputies Elections (Santiago Centro)

Candidate	Coalition	Party	Votes	%	Results
Giorgio Jackson Drago	Independent	IND	55 060	48.17	Deputy
Felipe Kast Sommerhoff	Alianza	ILJ	22 338	19.54	Deputy
Mónica Zalaquett Said	Alianza	UDI	21 265	18.60	
Mario Schilling Fuenzalida	Si tú quieres, Chile cambia	ILI	5468	4.78	
Eduardo Contreras Marín	Nueva Constitución para Chile	IGUAL	4349	3.80	
Cristián Orellana Álvarez	Partido Humanista	PH	3226	2.82	
Octavio González Ojeda	Partido Humanista	PH	1457	1.27	
Rony Núñez Mesquida	Si tú quieres, Chile cambia	ILI	1129	0.98	
