= Javiera Toro Cáceres =

Chilean politician

Javiera Toro
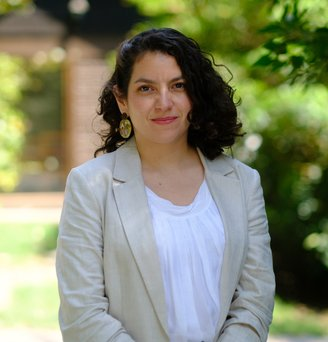

Minister of Social Development
- In office 16 August 2023 – 11 March 2026
- President: Gabriel Boric
- Preceded by: Giorgio Jackson
- Succeeded by: María Jesús Wulf

Minister of National Assets
- In office 11 March 2022 – 16 August 2023
- President: Gabriel Boric
- Preceded by: Julio Isamit
- Succeeded by: Marcela Sandoval

Personal details
- Born: 10 October 1987 (age 38) Santiago, Chile
- Party: Commons (2019−present)
- Other political affiliations: Autonomous Left (2008−2019)
- Parent(s): Gustavo Toro Vega; María Cáceres
- Education: University of Chile (LL.B)
- Occupation: Politician
- Profession: Lawyer

Javiera Alejandra Toro Cáceres (born 10 October 1987) is a Chilean politician and lawyer who currently serves as Minister of Social Development and Family since August 2023.

She previously served as Minister of National Assets between 2022 and 2023.

Between March 2022 and August 2023, she served as Minister of National Assets under the administration of President Gabriel Boric. From August 2023, she assumed office as Minister of Social Development and Family.

== Family and education ==
She was born in Santiago, the daughter of Gustavo Elías Toro Vega and María Pamela Cáceres Meza. She completed her secondary education at La Girouette School in the commune of Las Condes. She later pursued higher education in law at the University of Chile, qualifying as a lawyer in 2015.

In the professional field, she worked as a researcher at the Nodo XXI Foundation between 2014 and 2016, while simultaneously serving as its director from March 2015, and again in 2020. She has also worked as a lawyer in various law firms; she was an associate at the firm Mauricio Tapia Asesores Legales between 2013 and 2016, and later worked at Ferrada Nehme until 2019.

== Political career ==
Politically, she participated in the student movement beginning in 2006 at the Faculty of Law of the University of Chile as a member of the student collective Estudiantes Autónomos (later Autonomous Left). She served as secretary general of the Law Students’ Association between 2008 and 2009, alongside Gabriel Boric, who was then president of the organisation.

She was content coordinator for the 2017 presidential campaign of Broad Front candidate Beatriz Sánchez, and later ran as a candidate for the Constitutional Convention in 11th District, although she was not elected. A founding member of the party Comunes, she served as its president between January 2019 and July 2020.

While holding that position, during the social uprising of October 2019, she was one of the signatories of the “Agreement for Social Peace and a New Constitution”, which enabled the institutional pathway to initiate the constitutional process in the country.

She was also a member of the strategic team of presidential candidate Gabriel Boric’s campaign ahead of the 2021 election.

On 21 January 2022, she was appointed Minister of National Assets by then president-elect Gabriel Boric, becoming the seventh woman to hold the post. She assumed office on 11 March 2022, with the start of the Gabriel Boric administration.

On 16 August 2023, she was appointed Minister of Social Development and Family by President Boric.
