= Felipe Ward =

Chilean lawyer and politician

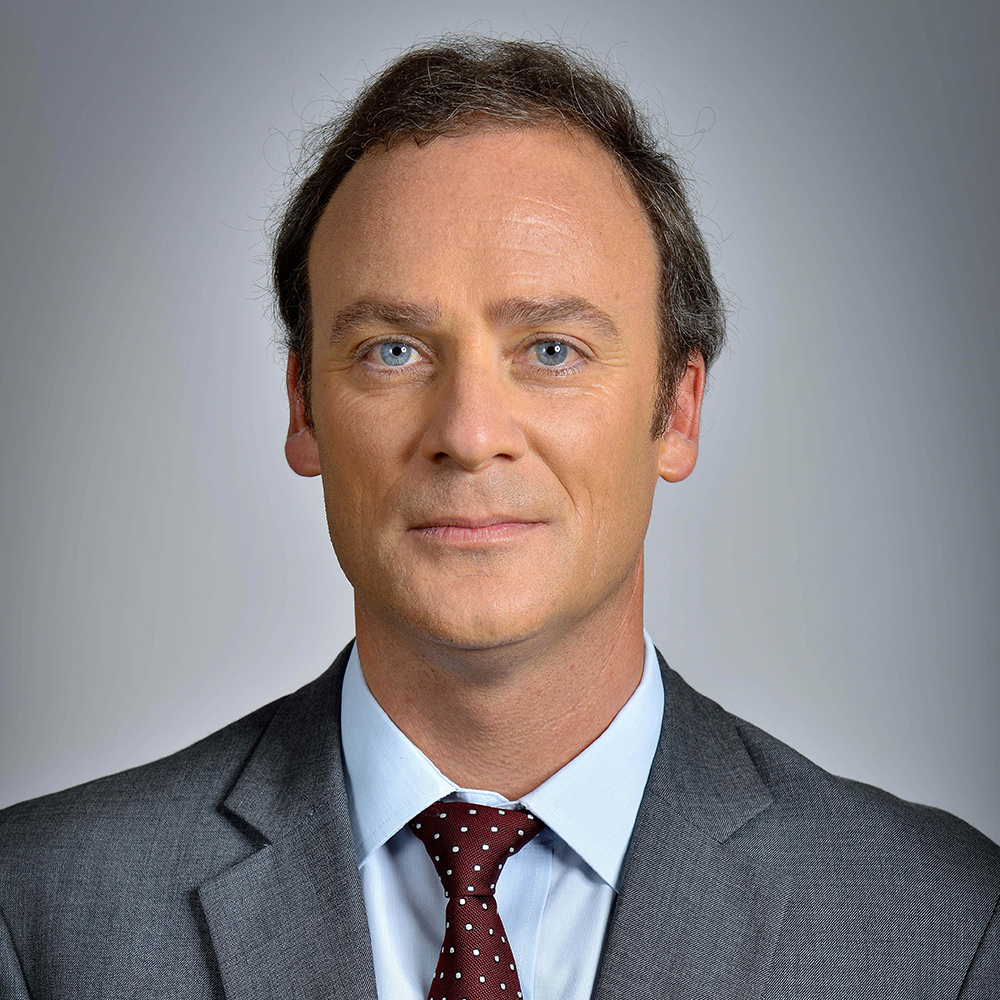
- Official portrait (2018)

Minister of Housing & Urbanism
- In office 4 June 2020 – 11 March 2022
- President: Sebastián Piñera
- Preceded by: Cristián Monckeberg
- Succeeded by: Carlos Montes Cisternas

Minister Secretary-General of the Presidency
- In office 28 October 2018 – 4 June 2020
- Preceded by: Gonzalo Blumel
- Succeeded by: Claudio Alvarado

Minister of National Assets
- In office 11 March 2018 – 28 October 2019
- Preceded by: Nivia Palma
- Succeeded by: Julio Isamit

Member of the Chamber of Deputies
- In office 11 March 2006 – 11 March 2018
- Preceded by: Waldo Mora Longa
- Succeeded by: District dissolved
- Constituency: 3rd District (Calama, María Elena, Ollagüe, San Pedro de Atacama and Tocopilla)

Personal details
- Born: 14 September 1972 (age 54) Santiago, Chile
- Party: Independent Democratic Union (UDI)
- Spouse: Andrea Moreno
- Children: Four
- Parent(s): Carlos Ward; María Teresa Edwards
- Education: Universidad de Los Andes (LL.B)
- Occupation: Politician
- Profession: Lawyer

Felipe Andrés Ward Edwards (born 14 September 1972) is a Chilean politician and lawyer, militant from Independent Democratic Union (UDI). Since 4 June 2020, he has served as Minister of Housing & Urbanism during the second government of Sebastián Piñera (2018–2022).

Previously, he was Minister of National Assets (2018–2020) during Piñera's second government as well as Minister Secretary General of the Presidency (2019–2020).

== Biography ==
He was born on 14 September 1972 in Santiago, Chile. He is the son of Carlos Ward Duncan and María Teresa Edwards, and the brother of Carlos Ward, who served as councilor of Lo Barnechea (2008–2012).

He is married to Andrea Moreno and is the father of four children.

=== Professional career ===
He completed his primary and secondary education at Colegio Tabancura in Santiago. He later studied Law at Universidad de los Andes, where he obtained a Bachelor of Laws degree with the thesis "Contenido y alcance de la ley de presupuestos y principios de legalidad y flexibilidad en materia presupuestaria" (1997). He was admitted as a lawyer on 28 December 1998.

Between 2001 and 2002 he completed a Master of Arts in Interdisciplinary Studies at George Mason University in Virginia, United States.

Professionally, he worked as a Research Assistant at the Center for International Trade and Economics of The Heritage Foundation in Washington, D.C.

== Political career ==
He is a member of the Independent Democratic Union (UDI), where he has served as president of its youth wing and as a member of the party's Political Commission.

At the beginning of President Sebastián Piñera's second term, he was appointed Minister of National Assets, serving until 28 October 2019.

On that date he assumed as Minister Secretary General of the Presidency, holding the office until 4 June 2020. From that date he served as Minister of Housing and Urbanism until 11 March 2022.

He served as advisor to the Housing Department of the Municipality of La Florida until 9 September 2024.
