= Jadue =

Jadue is a Palestinian surname common in Chile. Notable people with the surname include:

- Daniel Jadue (born 1967), Chilean politician, architect and sociologist
- Liliana Jadue (born 1960), Chilean politician and surgeon
- Matías Jadue (born 1992), Chilean-born Palestinian footballer
- Sergio Jadue (born 1979), former president of the National Association of Professional Football of Chile
- Soraya Jadué (born 1975), Chilean rower
