= Jeannette Vega =

Chilean politician

Jeanette Vega
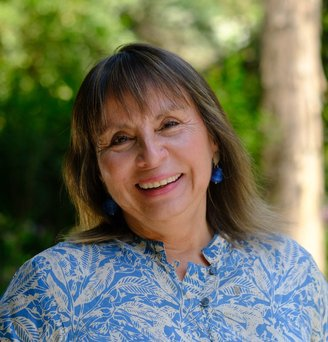
- Vega in March 2022

Minister of Social Development
- In office 11 March 2022 – 25 August 2022
- President: Gabriel Boric
- Preceded by: Karla Rubilar
- Succeeded by: Paula Poblete

Undersecretary of Public Health
- In office 14 January 2008 – 1 March 2010
- President: Michelle Bachelet
- Preceded by: Lidia Amarales
- Succeeded by: Liliana Jadue

Personal details
- Born: 11 October 1957 (age 68) Santiago, Chile
- Party: Party for Democracy (1988−2018)
- Children: One
- Parent(s): Pedro Vega; María Rosa Morales
- Education: University of Chile (B.Sc); University of Illinois (M.Sc)
- Occupation: Politician
- Profession: Physician

Jeanette del Rosario Vega Morales (born 11 October 1957) is a Chilean politician and physician. Between March and August 2022, she served as Chile's Minister of Social Development and Family.

On 25 August 2022, Vega resigned following a news report that one of her advisers, on her behalf, had contacted a Mapuche indigenous terrorist leader Héctor Llaitul who had called for an armed struggled against the state and who was arrested the day before.

== Biography ==
=== Family and education ===
She is the daughter of civil engineer Pedro Octavio Vega Marín and María Rosa Morales Umaña.

She completed her primary and secondary education at the Liceo 7 of Santiago. She pursued undergraduate studies at the University of Chile and later specialised in family medicine. Years later, she completed a PhD in public health at the University of Illinois in the United States.

=== Professional career ===
After completing her postgraduate studies, she returned to Chile and subsequently worked at the Pan American Health Organization (PAHO) as a national consultant in epidemiology and chronic diseases.

During the government of President Ricardo Lagos, in 2001, she became part of the “Executive Secretariat for Health Reform” and served as director of the Institute of Public Health of Chile, a position from which she resigned on 15 October 2002. Subsequently, between 2003 and 2007, she worked at the World Health Organization (WHO) in Geneva (Switzerland). At the international organisation, she served as director of the Department of Equity, Poverty and Social Determinants of Health.

In March 2018, she joined the UC Christus Health Network as director of Medical Innovation and Digital Transformation. In addition, in her role as an external advisor to the WHO, in 2019 she collaborated with a group of scientists from the Global Preparedness Monitoring Board to present the report A World at Risk: Annual Report on Global Preparedness for Health Emergencies. The document warned of the risks of a potential pandemic.

The report indicated that the risk of widespread epidemics was becoming increasingly serious and that the world still lacked the necessary preparedness measures to face such a scenario. It stressed the need for a global emergency plan and an organised surveillance system, noting that “it is not possible to confront pandemics if each state wages the battle on its own”.
