= Julio Isamit =

Chilean journalist and politician (b. 1989)

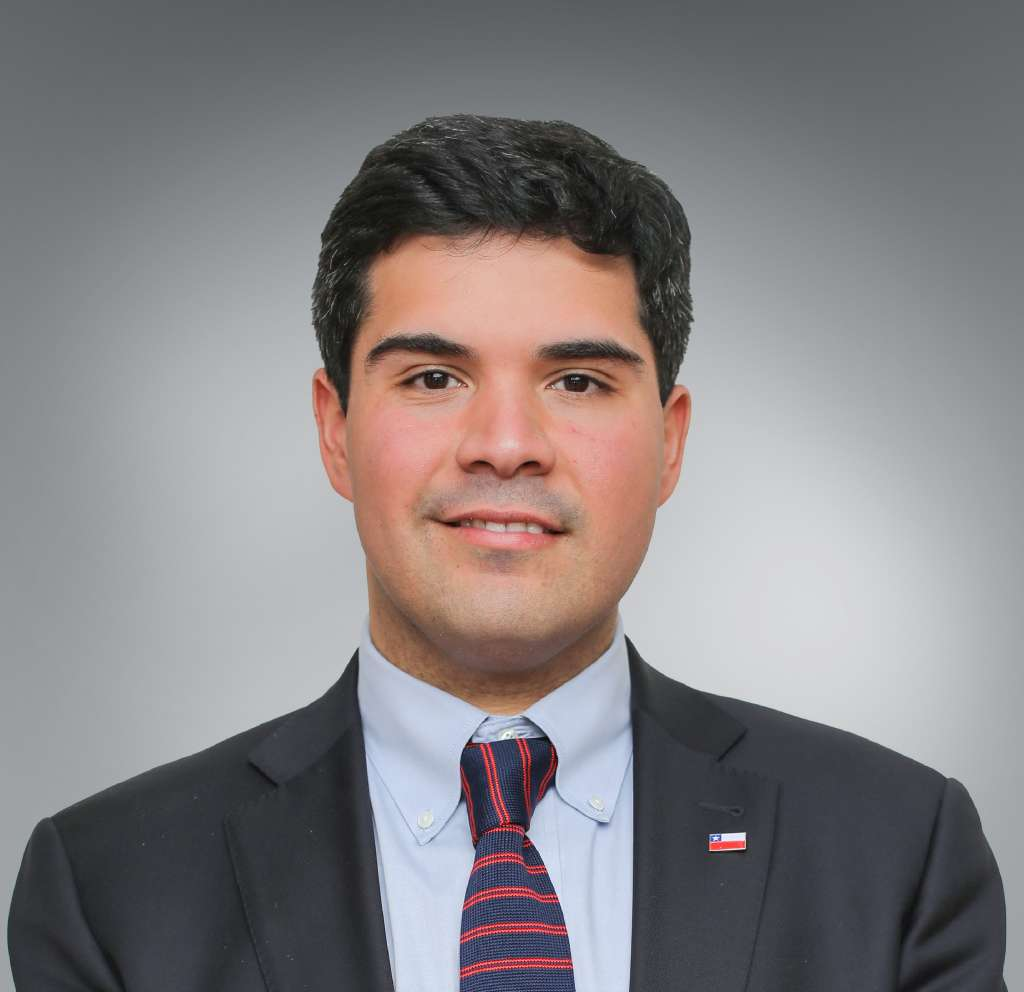
- Official portrait (2019)

Minister of National Assets
- In office 28 October 2019 – 11 March 2022
- President: Sebastián Piñera
- Preceded by: Felipe Ward
- Succeeded by: Javiera Toro Cáceres

Personal details
- Born: 18 February 1989 (age 37) Santiago, Chile
- Party: Close to Unión Demócrata Independiente (2017)
- Parent(s): Manuel Ángel Isamit; Julia del Tránsito Díaz
- Education: Pontifical Catholic University of Chile (LL.B)
- Occupation: Politician
- Profession: Lawyer

Julio Isamit Díaz (born 18 August 1989) is a Chilean politician and lawyer. In 2006, he was part of the Pingüino Movement (2006).

He was named Minister of National Assets on 28 October 2019 amid the 2019–20 social crisis («Estallido Social»).

== Family ==
He was born in San Bernardo in 1989, the eldest of two siblings born to Miguel Ángel Isamit Cortés and Julia del Tránsito Díaz Salazar.

He is married to civil engineer Trinidad Donoso, with whom he has two children.

== Education ==
He completed his primary education at Saint Arieli School in San Bernardo and his secondary education at the Instituto Nacional General José Miguel Carrera in Santiago.

In 2006, he was one of the student leaders of the so-called Penguin Revolution as a member of the Instituto Nacional Student Center (CAIN).

In 2007, he enrolled in geography at the Pontifical Catholic University of Chile, later switching to study law at the same institution. He served as a teaching assistant in Legal History and Constitutional Law.

In 2016, he was admitted to the bar before the Supreme Court of Chile.

He is currently pursuing a Master’s degree in Public Policy at the University of Chicago.

== Political career ==
In 2015, he participated in the creation of the political movement Republicanos. That same year, the movement joined the Chile Vamos coalition. He later joined the political committee of Sebastián Piñera’s presidential campaign between September and November 2017.

On 28 October 2019, following a cabinet reshuffle during Piñera’s second administration amid the 2019–2020 Chilean protests, he was appointed Minister of National Assets, replacing Felipe Ward. At age 30, he was among the youngest ministers in Chilean history.

He remained in office until the end of the administration in March 2022. In April 2022, he became Director of Content at Res Pública, a public policy institute.
