= Víctor Osorio Reyes =

Chilean politician

Víctor Osorio
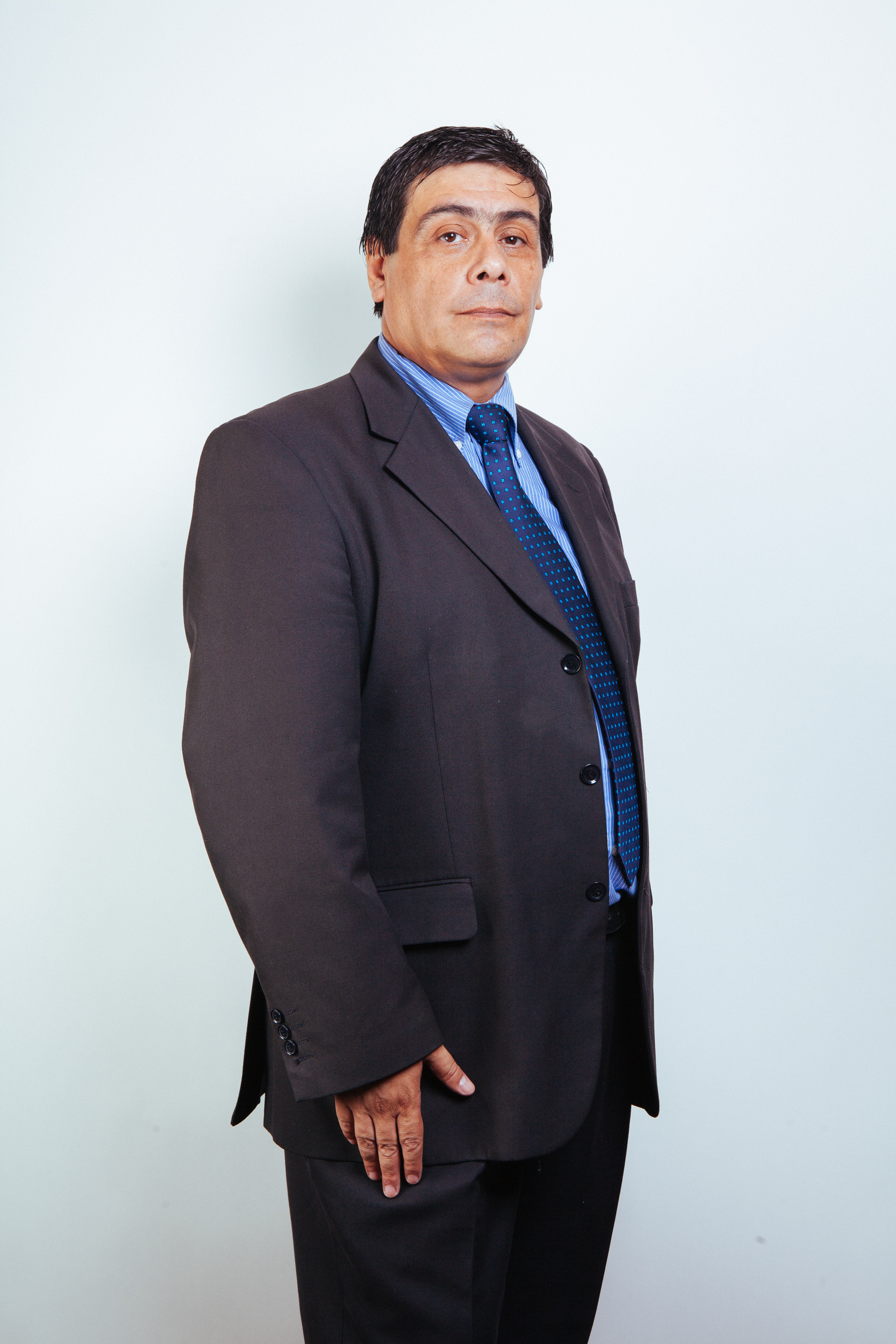
- Official portrait (2014)

Minister of National Assets
- In office 11 March 2014 – 19 October 2016
- President: Michelle Bachelet
- Preceded by: Rodrigo Pérez Mackenna
- Succeeded by: Nivia Palma

President of Citizen Left
- In office 2012–2014
- Preceded by: Manuel Jacques
- Succeeded by: Cristián Méndez

President of Christian Left
- In office 2012–2014
- Preceded by: Manuel Jacques
- Succeeded by: Manuel Jacques

Personal details
- Born: 27 October 1965 (age 60) Santiago, Chile
- Party: Christian Left; Citizen Left; MAS Citizen Left; Progressive Party
- Education: Pedro de Valdivia University (BA)
- Occupation: Politician
- Profession: Journalist

Víctor Hugo Osorio Reyes (born 27 October 1965) is a Chilean journalist and politician who served as minister during the second government of Michelle Bachelet (2014–2018).

== Early life and education ==
Osorio was born in Maipú, in the western sector of the Santiago Metropolitan Region, and was adopted by a working-class couple. He completed his primary education at Liceo A No. 73 (now Santiago Bueras y Avaria) and his secondary education at Instituto Superior de Comercio No. 2 (Insucodos). He earned a degree in journalism from the Pedro de Valdivia University and also pursued studies at ARCIS University.

Osorio is a member of the Chilean Journalists Association. During the 1990s, he worked for media outlets including the newspaper La Nación and the magazine Ercilla. He also served as national editor of United Press International (UPI) and editor of news and special reports at the newspaper El Metropolitano. In 2005, he founded the online newspaper Crónica Digital, serving as its first editor-in-chief.

He has also published several journalistic works. Osorio co-authored the investigative book Los hijos de Pinochet (1995) and contributed to the collective volume Morir es la noticia (1997), alongside more than 60 journalists. Other works include El viaje secreto de Hugo Chávez a Chile (2011) and Fragmentos de una larga jornada (2012), both published by Ediciones Escaparate.

Osorio received an honourable mention at the VIII José Martí Latin American Journalism Award, sponsored by the Latin American News Agency Prensa Latina.

== Political career ==
Osorio joined the Christian Left (IC) in 1983.

He played a prominent role in the National Days of Protest against the military regime of Augusto Pinochet, becoming one of the principal founders of the Pro-FESES Committee in April 1985. The committee brought together secondary-school students opposed to the regime and, in 1986, promoted the re-establishment of the Federation of Secondary Students of Santiago (FESES), the main secondary-student organization prior to its dissolution in 1973. He also represented secondary-school students in the National Assembly of Civil Society, which organized the national strike of 2–3 July 1986, one of the largest mass mobilizations in modern Chilean history.

That same year, Osorio was among the leading organizers of the first major social mobilization against the municipalization and privatization of education introduced by the military government. These events were later documented in the film Actores Secundarios (2004) and in the book La Rebelión de los Pingüinos (2016) by journalist Juan Azócar Valdés.

Osorio joined the Political Commission of the Christian Left following its Second National Congress in December 2006, when the party was part of the left-wing coalition Juntos Podemos Más. At the party's Third National Congress in December 2010, he was elected president of the organization, becoming the first leader who had not been among its founders in 1971.

In July 2012, the Christian Left merged with other left-wing movements to form the Citizen Left (IC), and Osorio became its first president. In that capacity, he represented the party during the formation and early development of the New Majority coalition and participated in the political committee of Michelle Bachelet's 2013 presidential campaign.

On 24 January 2014, President-elect Bachelet announced Osorio's appointment as Minister of National Assets in her second administration. He assumed office on 11 March 2014 and consequently stepped down as president of the Citizen Left.
