= Nivia Palma =

Chilean former minister

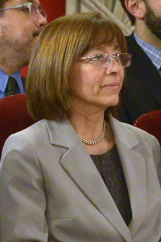
- Official portrait (2017)

Minister of National Assets
- In office 19 October 2016 – 11 March 2018
- President: Michelle Bachelet
- Preceded by: Víctor Osorio
- Succeeded by: Felipe Ward

Personal details
- Born: Nivia Palma Manríquez; 18 December 1959 (age 66) Santiago, Chile
- Party: Socialist Party
- Spouse: Sergio Aguiló
- Education: University of Chile (BA)
- Occupation: Politician
- Profession: Economist

Nivia Palma Manríquez (born 18 December 1959) is a Chilean politician and lawyer who served as minister of national assets. She is known for having a critical opinion to the Concertación, a centre-leftist coalition which governed during 20 years.

Palma worked as a lawyer specializing in labor law, being a trade union advisor and CEO of the non-governmental organization OFASAN (North Zone Trade Union Advisory Office). She has also been a professor in the PgD of Pontifical Catholic University of Chile in Cultural Administration, and she also taught in the University of Chile, specifically in its master's degree in cultural management.

In 2021, Palma worked as Paula Narváez's chief of campaign in the 2021 presidential primaries, in which she lost against the christian-democrat Yasna Provoste.

== Early life ==
Palma is a daughter of an evangelical pastor. She studied at the Los Angeles Girls' Lyceum (formerly Coeducational Santa María de Los Ángeles Lyceum). In 1978, she moved to the capital city Santiago to join the University of Chile School of Laws. There, she was a member of the University Cultural Association (ACU) and the theater group of her faculty.

== Political career ==
During the 1980s, Palma was part of the board of the party Christian Left. Later, she joined the Socialist Party, where she became a member of its Central Committee. Once arrived the democracy, she was a legislative advisor in the Chamber of Deputies during the XLVIII legislative period (1990−1994).

In January 1993, she became the national coordinator of the recently created National Fund for Cultural Development and the Arts (Fondart), being at the same time executive secretary of the Chilean National Book and Reading Council. Since 1997, she was representer of Chile in the Commission of Cultural Industries of the Mercosur. In September 2002, she resigned from these positions, accusing pressure from the Navy for the Regional Government of Valparaíso to withdraw from the "Fondart 10 Years Program" and for the prohibition of the then Minister of Education, Mariana Aylwin (christian-democrat), to attend at the premiere of the play Prat, by Manuela Infante, in which the national hero appeared with "traits of cowardice, alcoholism and homosexuality."

In 2002, she became the corporate manager of the National Book Chamber and of the Prolibro Society SA. During the first government of Michelle Bachelet (2006−2010), Palma headed the Directorate of Libraries, Archives and Museums (Dibam) and, due to his position, she also served as executive vice president of the Council of National Monuments and director of the National Library of Chile. During her management, the construction program of public libraries, the Digital Archive and the website Memoria Chilena was implemented. Similarly, she led the return of books to the National Library of Peru in Lima as well as various original documentary archives to that country.

In the second government of Bachelet, Palma worked as head of the Judicial Directorate of the Ministry of National Assets until June 2015, when she assumed as legislative advisor of Ernesto Ottone, then Minister of Culture.

On 19 October 2016, she replaced Víctor Osorio Reyes as the ministry of National Assets. Its management initiatives include the creation of the Patagonia Park Network, the handover of the administration of the Rapa Nui National Park to the Mau Henua community and, finally, the policy of non-conventional renewable energies in public lands or properties.
