= Klaus Schmidt-Hebbel =

Chilean economist

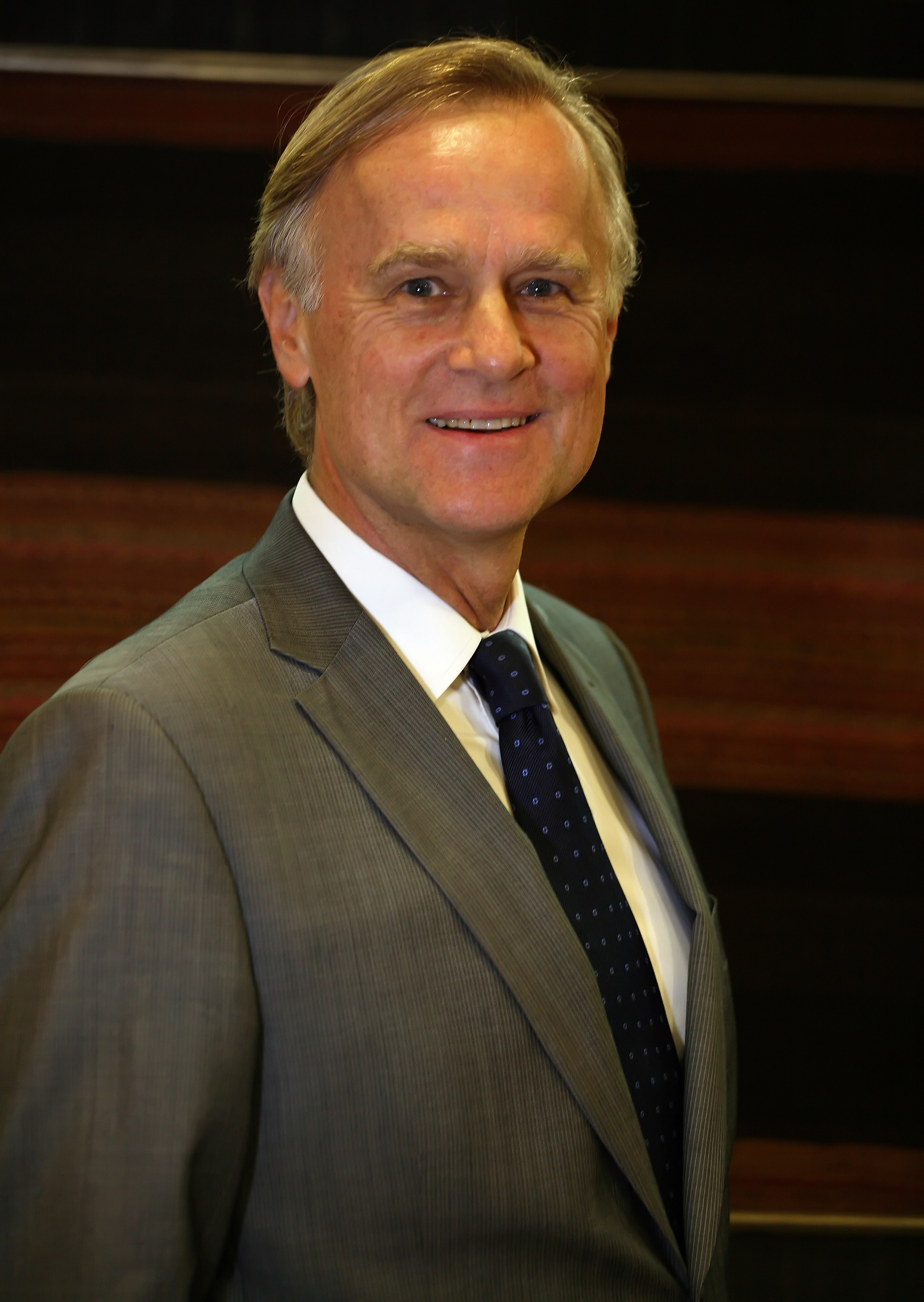
- Born: 26 February 1955 (age 71); Santiago, Chile

Academic background
- Education: Pontificia Universidad Católica de Chile (B.S./M.A.); Massachusetts Institute of Technology (Ph.D)
- Doctoral advisor: Rudi Dornbusch, Paul Krugman
- Awards: Economist of the Year, Economía y Negocios de El Mercurio (2008); Vicente Pérez Rosales Order, Chilean-German League (2012); Club Monetario Prize, Universidad Finis Terrae
- Website: www.kschmidt-hebbel.com; Information at IDEAS / RePEc

Klaus Schmidt-Hebbel (Santiago, Chile, February 26, 1955) is a Chilean economist. He was Chief Economist and Director of the Economic Department of the Organisation of Economic Cooperation and Development (OECD) in 2008 and 2009. He is Full Professor of Economics at Universidad del Desarrollo and Pontificia Universidad Católica de Chile (Catholic University of Chile).

== Education ==
He studied economics at Pontificia Universidad Católica de Chile, receiving a B.A. in 1976 and an M.Sc. in 1978 with a summa cum laude distinction. He received his Ph.D. in economics from the Massachusetts Institute of Technology (MIT) in 1986. His doctoral advisors were the economists Rudi Dornbusch and Paul Krugman.

== Career ==
Schmidt-Hebbel was at The World Bank from 1988 through 1996, where he was Principal Economist in the Bank's Research Department in Washington, DC, leading research in fiscal policy, saving, pension reform, and economic growth. From 1996 through 2008, Schmidt-Hebbel was the first Research Manager at the Central Bank of Chile where he led the Bank's research program and participated in the design and implementation of the monetary policy regime based on inflation targeting and a flexible exchange-rate system, contributing to Chile's macroeconomic stability.

From 2008 to 2009, Schmidt-Hebbel was the Chief Economist and Director of the Economics Department for OECD. He led the OECD's global and country studies on economic policy, stabilization, structural reforms, and growth. His leadership included advice on the policy response of member countries to the 2008 financial crisis and presentation of the OECD's flagship reports "Economic Outlook" and "Going for Growth".

Schmidt-Hebbel is a member of the boards and advisory councils of the Banco de Crédito e Inversiones, The Nature Conservancy, Fundación Chilena del Pacífico, Reforestemos and Make-a-Wish.

Schmidt-Hebbel is Full Professor at Pontificia Universidad Católica de Chile and Universidad del Desarrollo.

== Research and publications ==
Schmidt-Hebbel has published or edited 20 books. His main research areas comprise macroeconomic policies, saving, pension systems, growth, and development. He has also published in the economic fields of energy, crime, and happiness. He is one of the most-cited Latin American economists in RePEc.

He is a founding editor and/or editorial board member of several professional journals, including the International Journal of Central Banking, Journal of International Economics and Economic Policy, Economía Chilena, Revista de Análisis Económico and the book series of the Central Bank of Chile Banco Central de Chile. He is the President of Exponencial, the annual interdisciplinary conference of Universidad del Desarrollo.

He contributes to analysis and reform proposals of public policy, publishing opinion pieces at CIES (Universidad del Desarrollo), newspaper columns and op-ed contributions (El Mercurio).

== Distinctions and awards ==
- Distinguished as Economist of the Year, elected by his peers, Economía y Negocios de El Mercurio (2008)
- Awarded the Vicente Pérez Rosales Order by the Chilean-German League (2012)
- Awarded the Club Monetario Prize of Universidad Finis Terrae (2013)
