= Bruno Baranda =

Chilean politician

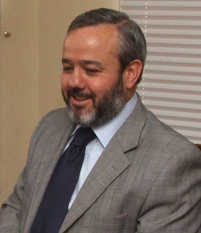

Head of Televisión Nacional de Chile
- In office 19 December 2018 – 24 December 2019
- President: Sebastián Pinera
- Preceded by: Francisco Orrego Bauzá
- Succeeded by: Ana Holuigue

Minister of Social Development
- In office 9 June 2013 – 11 March 2014
- President: Sebastián Pinera
- Preceded by: Joaquín Lavín
- Succeeded by: Fernanda Villegas

Undersecretary of Labor
- In office 30 June 2010 – 7 June 2013
- President: Sebastián Pinera
- Preceded by: Marcelo Soto
- Succeeded by: Fernando Arab

Councilman of Santiago
- In office 6 December 2008 – 30 June 2010
- Succeeded by: Álvaro Undurraga Julio

Personal details
- Born: 12 October 1963 (age 62) Santiago, Chile
- Party: Renovación Nacional (RN)
- Spouse: Paulette Dutilh
- Children: Four
- Parent(s): Guillermo Baranda; María Teresa Ferrán
- Relatives: Benito Baranda (brother)
- Education: Diego Portales University (LL.B)
- Occupation: Politician
- Profession: Lawyer

Bruno Antonio Baranda Ferrán (Born 12 October 1963) is a Chilean lawyer and politician. He was member of Renovación Nacional and Social Development Minister under President Sebastián Piñera's first government. Besides, during the same administration, he was Undersecretary of Labor.

From December 2018 until December 2019, he was Televisión Nacional de Chile's Board President.

He also served as secretary-general of National Renewal (RN) and as a councilor of the Santiago municipality. From December 2018 to December 2019, he served as chairman of the board of Televisión Nacional de Chile.

== Family and education ==
He comes from a large family of five brothers and five sisters, among them former provincial superior of the Society of Jesus, Father Guillermo Baranda, and former social director of the Hogar de Cristo and other social initiatives, Benito Baranda.

He studied at San Ignacio School, Tabancura School, and later at the Liceo José Victorino Lastarria. He subsequently entered the Arturo Prat Naval Academy, where he remained for three years. He later studied law at the Diego Portales University, graduating in 2001.

He has been married since 1995 to Paulette Dutilh Labbé, with whom he has four children.

== Public career ==
As a member of RN, he has also served on the party’s Political Commission and Supreme Tribunal.

In the 2008 Chilean municipal election, he was elected as a councilor for the Santiago municipality for the 2008–2012 term. He resigned in 2010 to assume office as Undersecretary of Labor, appointed by President Sebastián Piñera.

Until his appointment as Undersecretary of Labor, he practiced law, specializing in labor matters, primarily at the firm Baranda y Cía., which he founded in 1985. He is a member of the Chilean Bar Association and also served on the board of the Social Union of Christian Businesspeople and Executives (USEC).

In 2023, he was a candidate for the Constitutional Council representing the Santiago Metropolitan Region, but was not elected.
