= Felipe Guevara =

Chilean historian and politician

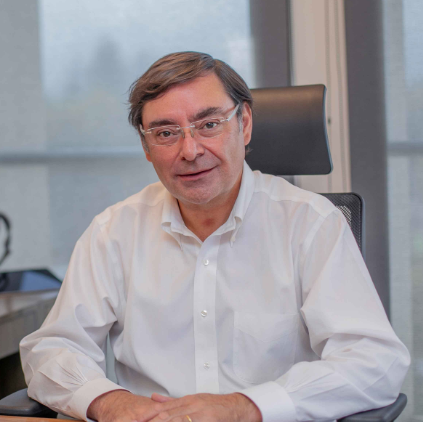

Presidencial Delegate of the Metropolitan Region of Santiago
- In office 14 July 2021 – 1 October 2021
- President: Sebastián Piñera Echenique
- Preceded by: position created

Intendant of the Metropolitan Region of Santiago
- In office 30 October 2019 – 14 July 2021
- Preceded by: Karla Rubilar
- Succeeded by: Dissolution of the charge by Regional Governor and Regional Presidential Delegate

Mayor of Lo Barnechea
- In office 6 December 2008 – 29 October 2019
- Preceded by: Marta Ehrers Bustamante
- Succeeded by: Cristóbal Lira Ibáñez

Personal details
- Born: 5 August 1967 (age 59) Santiago, Chile
- Party: Renovación Nacional (1997–)
- Spouse: Magdalena Agüero
- Children: Five
- Education: Pontifical Catholic University of Chile (MA); Adolfo Ibáñez University (BA)
- Occupation: Politician
- Profession: Historian

Felipe Guevara Stephens (born 5 August 1967) is a Chilean historian and politician.

Guevara served as mayor of the commune of Lo Barnechea for eleven years until the 2019–20 riots ("Estallido Social"), when he accepted then President Sebastián Piñera's offer to become intendant of capital city, Santiago de Chile, replacing Karla Rubilar, who'd been selected by Piñera to be Minister Secretary General of Government.
