= Marcos Barraza =

Chilean politician (born 1973)

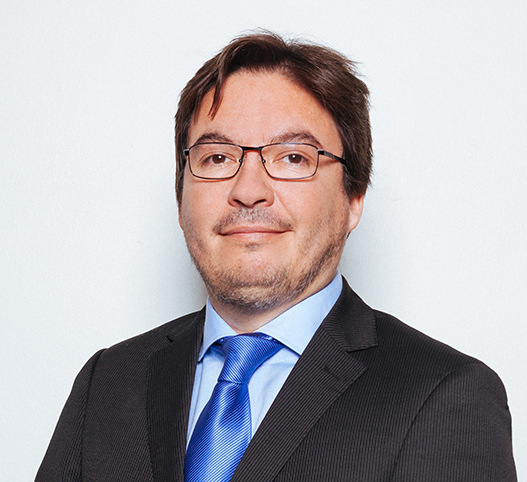

Member of the Chamber of Deputies
- Incumbent
- Assumed office 11 March 2026
- Constituency: 8th District

Member of the Constitutional Convention
- In office 4 July 2021 – 4 July 2022
- Constituency: 13th District

Minister of Social Development
- In office 11 May 2015 – 11 March 2018
- Preceded by: Fernanda Villegas
- Succeeded by: Alfredo Moreno Charme

Undersecretary of Social Development
- In office 11 March 2014 – 11 May 2015
- Preceded by: Alfredo Iglesias Palau
- Succeeded by: Julia Urquieta

Personal details
- Born: 25 March 1973 (age 53) Pedro de Valdivia Office, Chile
- Party: Communist Party
- Parent(s): Marcos Humberto Barraza; Patricia Gómez
- Education: University of Santiago, Chile (BA, PhD); University of Chile (MA)
- Occupation: Politician
- Profession: Psychologist

Marcos Barraza Gómez (born 25 March 1973) is a Chilean psychologist and politician.

A member of the Communist Party of Chile, he was elected as a member of the Constitutional Convention in 2021, representing the 13th District of the Metropolitan Region of Santiago.

He previously served as a cabinet minister from 2015 to 2018.

== Early life and family ==
Barraza was born on 25 March 1973 in the former nitrate mining town of Pedro de Valdivia, Antofagasta Region. He is the son of Marcos Humberto Barraza Núñez and Patricia Margarita Gómez Aguirre, both Communist Party members who are listed as political prisoners by the Valech Commission.

== Professional career ==
Barraza completed his secondary education at Liceo de Maipú, where he served as class president and later as vice president of the student council. He pursued higher education at the University of Santiago, Chile, earning a degree in psychology. He also completed studies in personnel administration technology and obtained a bachelor’s degree at the same institution.

During his time at the University of Santiago, he participated in the re-establishment of the student federation. In 1996, he was elected secretary of finance on a slate led by Jeannette Jara, later Minister of Labour.

Professionally, Barraza worked as a clinical psychologist at the National Council for the Defense of Children between 2008 and 2010. Between 2009 and 2013, he served as head of advisers to the Metro Trade Union Federation and as a forensic expert for the Public Prosecutor’s Office. From 2010 to 2013, he was executive director of the Alejandro Lipschutz Institute of Sciences (ICAL), the think tank of the Communist Party of Chile.

== Political career ==
Barraza joined the Communist Party of Chile at the age of 13 through its youth wing. He later became president of the Student Federation of the University of Santiago and a member of the party's Central Committee.

During the second administration of President Michelle Bachelet, he served as Undersecretary of Social Security between 2014 and 2015 and as Minister of Social Development from 2015 to 2018. His appointment marked the first time a Communist Party member had entered the Chilean cabinet since the 1973 coup d'état.

In the elections held on 15–16 May 2021, Barraza ran as a candidate for the Constitutional Convention representing the 13th District of the Metropolitan Region, as part of the Apruebo Dignidad electoral pact for the Communist Party of Chile. He obtained 11,217 votes, corresponding to 4.87% of the valid votes cast, and entered the Convention through the gender parity mechanism.

Within the Convention, he coordinated the Ethics Committee. His work included negotiations with right-wing delegates on issues related to an attenuated presidential system and debates over the two-thirds quorum established by the 15 November Agreement, which the Communist Party did not sign. He also played an active role in discussions concerning the abolition of the Senate and the constraints on constitutional reform by the sitting Congress should the draft constitution be approved in the exit plebiscite.
