= Paula Poblete =

Chilean politician

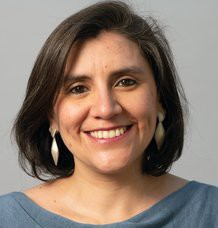

Undersecretary of Social Evaluation
- In office 6 September 2022 – 11 March 2026
- President: Gabriel Boric
- Preceded by: Alejandra Candia

Minister of Social Development
- In office 11 March 2022 – 6 September 2022
- President: Gabriel Boric
- Preceded by: Jeannette Vega
- Succeeded by: Giorgio Jackson

Personal details
- Born: 5 August 1978 (age 48) Santiago, Chile
- Party: Democratic Revolution
- Education: Pontifical Catholic University of Chile (B.Sc); University of Chile (PhD)
- Occupation: Politician
- Profession: Economist

Paula Poblete Maureira (born 5 August 1978) is a Chilean economist and politician who temporally served as minister of Social Development after Jeannette Vega's departure.

== Biography ==
She was born on 5 August 1978 in the Chilean city of Santiago.

=== Education ===
She graduated in 1996 from the Compañía de María Seminary School in Providencia.

She pursued higher education in economics with a minor in sociology at the Pontifical Catholic University (PUC), and later completed a master's degree in public policy at the University of Chile.

=== Professional career ===
She has worked in both the public and private sectors. She served as a researcher at the National Council of Culture and the Arts (CNCA) during the governments of Ricardo Lagos and Michelle Bachelet between September 2003 and February 2007. She later worked as an analyst in the National Accounts Department of the Central Bank of Chile from March 2007 to April 2010. She also served as a researcher in the Studies, Projects and Advisory Area of the consultancy firm FOCUS between May and September 2013.

From May 2014 to January 2022, she served as Director of Studies at the organisation Comunidad Mujer, conducting research on issues related to labour, social protection and gender.

In parallel, she has worked as an academic at undergraduate and postgraduate levels at the University of Valparaíso, Catholic University of Valparaíso, Adolfo Ibáñez University and Diego Portales University, teaching courses on economics and gender gaps.

Among other activities, she was a panelist on the analysis programme Reunión de Pauta on Radio Pauta, where she regularly presented her views on current national issues.
