= Fernanda Villegas =

Chilean politician

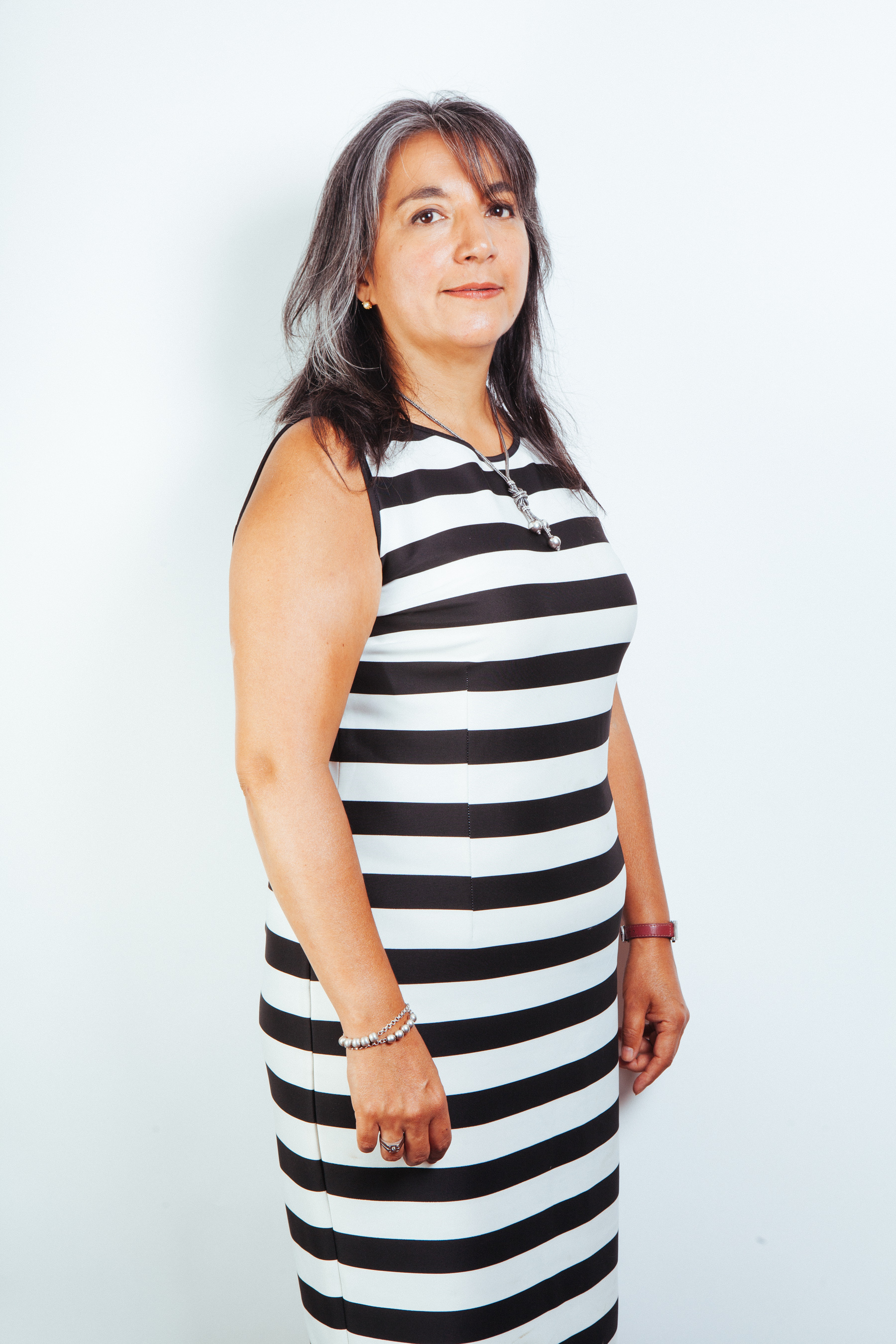

Minister of Social Development
- In office 11 March 2014 – 11 May 2015
- President: Michelle Bachelet
- Preceded by: Bruno Baranda
- Succeeded by: Marcos Barraza

Personal details
- Born: 9 March 1963 (age 63) Antofagasta, Chile
- Party: Socialist Party (1990−present)
- Spouse: Carlos Caro
- Education: Pontifical Catholic University of Valparaíso
- Occupation: Politician
- Profession: Theologist

María Fernanda Villegas Acevedo (born 9 March 1963) is a Chilean theologist and politician.

She was minister of the second government of Michelle Bachelet (2014−2018).

== Early life ==
Villegas was born in Antofagasta on 9 March 1963, the daughter of Luis Víctor Villegas Riveros, a technician, and Irma del Carmen Acevedo Marambio, a midwife and nurse. She is partnered with historian and businessman Carlos Cano Barriga.

== Political career ==
Villegas was a member of the Christian Left (IC) before joining the Socialist Party of Chile (PS) in 1990, where she has remained active ever since.

During the administration of President Ricardo Lagos (2000–2006), she served as head of the Economic Development and Poverty Reduction Unit and as an adviser to the National Women's Service (SERNAM). In 2007, she joined the Solidarity and Social Investment Fund (FOSIS) as an adviser.

In 2008, she became chief of staff to Minister of Planning Clarisa Hardy. Between 2009 and 2010, she served as an adviser to the Presidency and executive secretary of the Social Protection Network (Red Protege), both positions held during the first administration of Michelle Bachelet. In 2013, she joined Bachelet's presidential campaign as head of the networks and citizenship team ahead of the 2013 Chilean presidential election.

On 11 March 2014, at the beginning of the second Bachelet administration, Villegas was appointed Ministry of Social Development and Family. She served until 11 May 2015, becoming the sixth woman to hold the office. During her tenure, she promoted the first National Indigenous Consultation and incorporated the "March Bonus" programme into Chile's social protection system.

In 2024, the Socialist Party nominated Villegas to compete in the 2024 Contigo Chile Mejor municipal primaries for the mayoralty of Providencia. She received 34.40% of the vote but was narrowly defeated by Social Convergence candidate Macarena Fernández, who won 35.44% of ballots cast.

In the 2025 Chilean general election, she ran for the 10th electoral district in the Santiago Metropolitan Region. She was not elected.
