= Karla Rubilar =

Chilean physician and politician

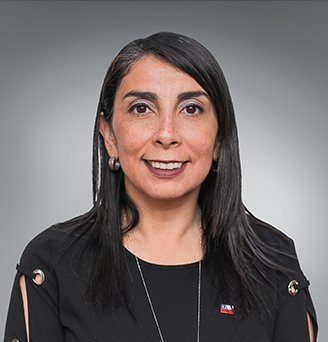
- Official portrait of Karla Rubilar

Minister of Social Development and Family
- In office 28 July 2020 – 11 March 2022
- President: Sebastián Piñera
- Preceded by: Cristián Monckeberg
- Succeeded by: Jeannette Vega

Minister General Secretariat of Government
- In office 28 October 2019 – 28 July 2020
- Preceded by: Cecilia Pérez
- Succeeded by: Jaime Bellolio

Intendant of the Metropolitan Region of Santiago
- In office 11 March 2018 – 28 October 2019
- Preceded by: Claudio Orrego
- Succeeded by: Felipe Guevara

Member of the Chamber of Deputies
- In office 11 March 2006 – 11 March 2018
- Preceded by: Pablo Longueira
- Succeeded by: District dissolved
- Constituency: 17th District

Personal details
- Born: 17 April 1977 (age 49) Santiago, Chile
- Party: Renovación Nacional (2004–2014); Amplitude (2014–2015); Independent close to centre-right (2015–)
- Spouse(s): Rubén Malvoa (2009–2018); Christian Pino (2019–)
- Children: Four
- Parent(s): Patricio Rubilar; Vicky Barahona
- Education: University of Santiago de Chile
- Occupation: Politician
- Profession: Physician

Karla Elizabeth Rubilar Barahona (born 17 April 1977) is a Chilean physician and politician. During the second government of Sebastián Piñera (2018–2022), she has been a minister twice.

She is a member of the Chilean Medical College.

== Early life and family ==
She was born on 17 April 1977, in Santiago, Chile. She is the daughter of Patricio Rubilar and Vicky Barahona, who served as mayor of Renca for four consecutive terms (2000–2016).

She was married to Rubén Malvoa, former mayor of Conchalí (2008–2012), and is the mother of four children: Patricio Cadis Rubilar, Laura Malvoa Rubilar, Karla Malvoa Rubilar, and Rubén Malvoa Rubilar.

== Professional career ==
She completed her primary education at Colegio Isabel La Católica Madres Escolapias and her secondary education at Colegio de La Salle in La Reina. She studied medicine at the University of Santiago, where she obtained the degree of Surgeon (M.D.). She later specialized in Primary Health Care and earned a master's degree in Public Health with a mention in Health Economics at the University of Chile.

As a healthcare professional, she worked in various primary care centers and institutions. In 1998 she served in a SAPU (Primary Emergency Care Service) shift at Consultorio Aníbal Ariztía, and the following year worked in outpatient care at the same center.

In 2000 she worked as a technical assistant in internal medicine residency shifts at the Military Hospital. In 2001 she performed voluntary shifts in the Maternal Emergency Unit and in the Surgical Sterilization Polyclinic at Hospital El Pino, and also served as a technical assistant in the SAPU shift in Renca.

The following year she carried out an ad honorem advisory role in the Health Directorate of the Municipal Corporation of Renca and worked as an instructor for first-year medical students at Andrés Bello National University (UNAB).

Between 2003 and 2004 she taught Public Health at Universidad Tecnológica de Chile (INACAP) and advised telemedicine projects at Tecmedica S.A. From October 2003 to September 2005 she served as advisor to the Health Directorate in the validation process of Family Health Centers of the Municipality of Recoleta.

In 2005 she carried out an advisory role in health promotion in schools of the Municipality of Vitacura.

== Political career ==
In politics, she joined the youth wing of National Renewal (RN), where she was part of the projects commission and participated in bicentennial workshops. She was a founding member of MEP (Movimiento de Estudiantes y Profesionales), an organization that provides training talks and social work under the Institute Libertad, and also founded the youth command supporting Sebastián Piñera.

On 7 January 2014 she resigned from RN, together with deputies Joaquín Godoy Ibáñez and Pedro Browne, to form the political movement Amplitude, which was later joined by Senator Lily Pérez. She was a member of the Political Committee of that movement. On 15 May 2015 she resigned from Amplitud.

She served as Intendant of the Santiago Metropolitan Region from 11 March 2018 to 28 October 2019. On that same day she was appointed Minister Secretary General of Government under President Piñera, holding the position until 28 July 2020, when she assumed as Minister of Social Development and Family. She served in that role until 11 March 2022.

Running as an independent candidate within the Chile Vamos coalition, she won the primary election to become mayor of Puente Alto on 9 June 2024, obtaining 18,155 votes, the highest number nationwide in those primaries. However, in the municipal elections held on 26 and 27 October 2024, she was not elected mayor.
