= Ministry of Social Development and Family =

Chilean government ministry

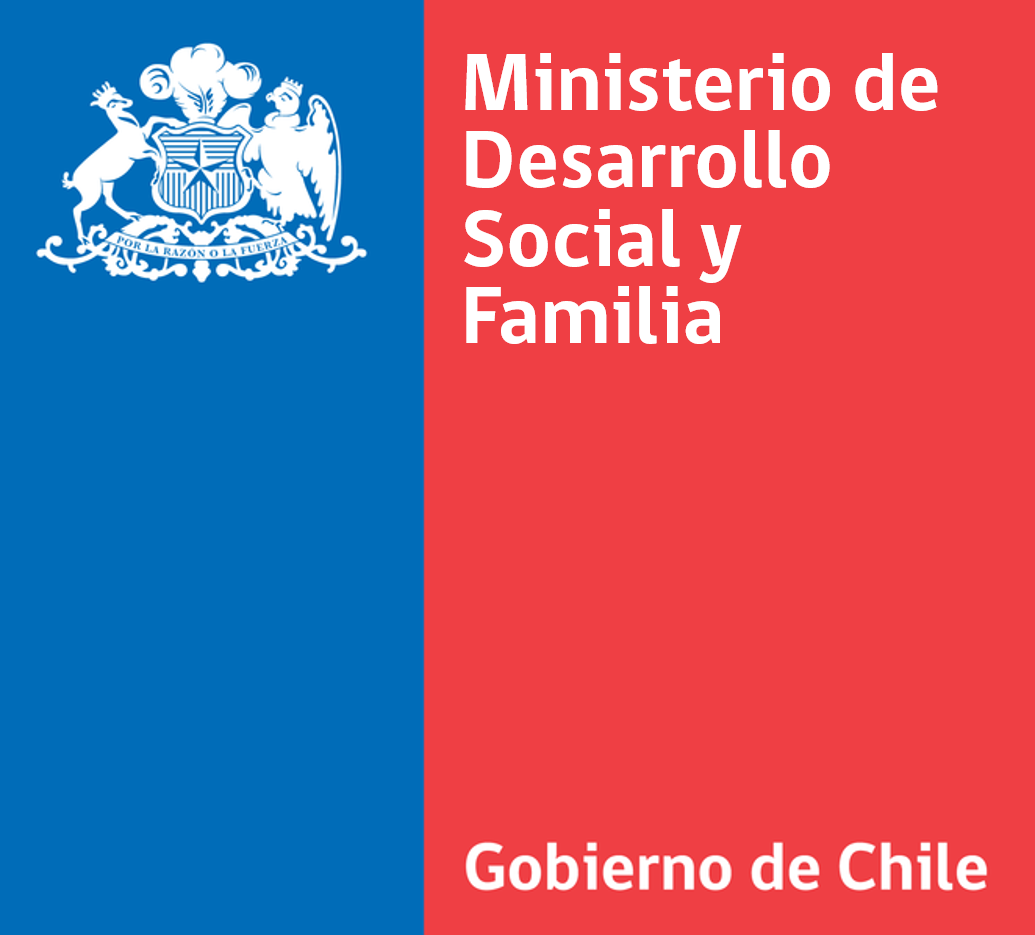

The Ministry of Social Development and Family (Spanish: Ministerio de Desarrollo Social y Familia) is a government ministry in Chile, established during Sebastián Piñera's first presidency (2006–2010) to replace the Ministry of Planning (1990–2011).

The minister since 11 March 2026 is María Jesús Wulf.

== List of representatives ==
| | Minister | Party | Term start | Term end | President |
|---|---|---|---|---|---|
| | Joaquín Lavín | UDI | 13 January 2011 | 6 June 2013 | Sebastián Piñera |
| | Bruno Baranda | RN | 7 June 2013 | 11 March 2014 | Sebastián Piñera |
| | Fernanda Villegas | PS | 11 March 2014 | 11 May 2015 | Michelle Bachelet |
| | Marcos Barraza | PC | 11 May 2015 | 11 March 2018 | Michelle Bachelet |
| | Alfredo Moreno | Independent | 11 March 2018 | 13 June 2019 | Sebastián Piñera |
| | Sebastián Sichel | Independent | 13 June 2019 | 4 June 2020 | Sebastián Piñera |
| | Cristián Monckeberg | RN | 4 June 2020 | 28 July 2020 | Sebastián Piñera |
| | Karla Rubilar | Independent | 28 July 2020 | 11 March 2022 | Sebastián Piñera |
| | Jeannette Vega | Independent | 11 March 2022 | 25 August 2022 | Gabriel Boric |
| | Paula Poblete | RD | 25 August 2022 | 6 September 2022 | Gabriel Boric |
| | Giorgio Jackson | RD | 6 September 2022 | 11 August 2023 | Gabriel Boric |
| Javiera Toro | Javiera Toro Cáceres | Comunes (Chile) | 16 August 2023 | 11 March 2026 | Gabriel Boric |
| | María Jesús Wulf | Republican | 11 March 2026 | Incumbent | José Antonio Kast |
