= Benito Baranda =

Chilean psychologist (born 1959)

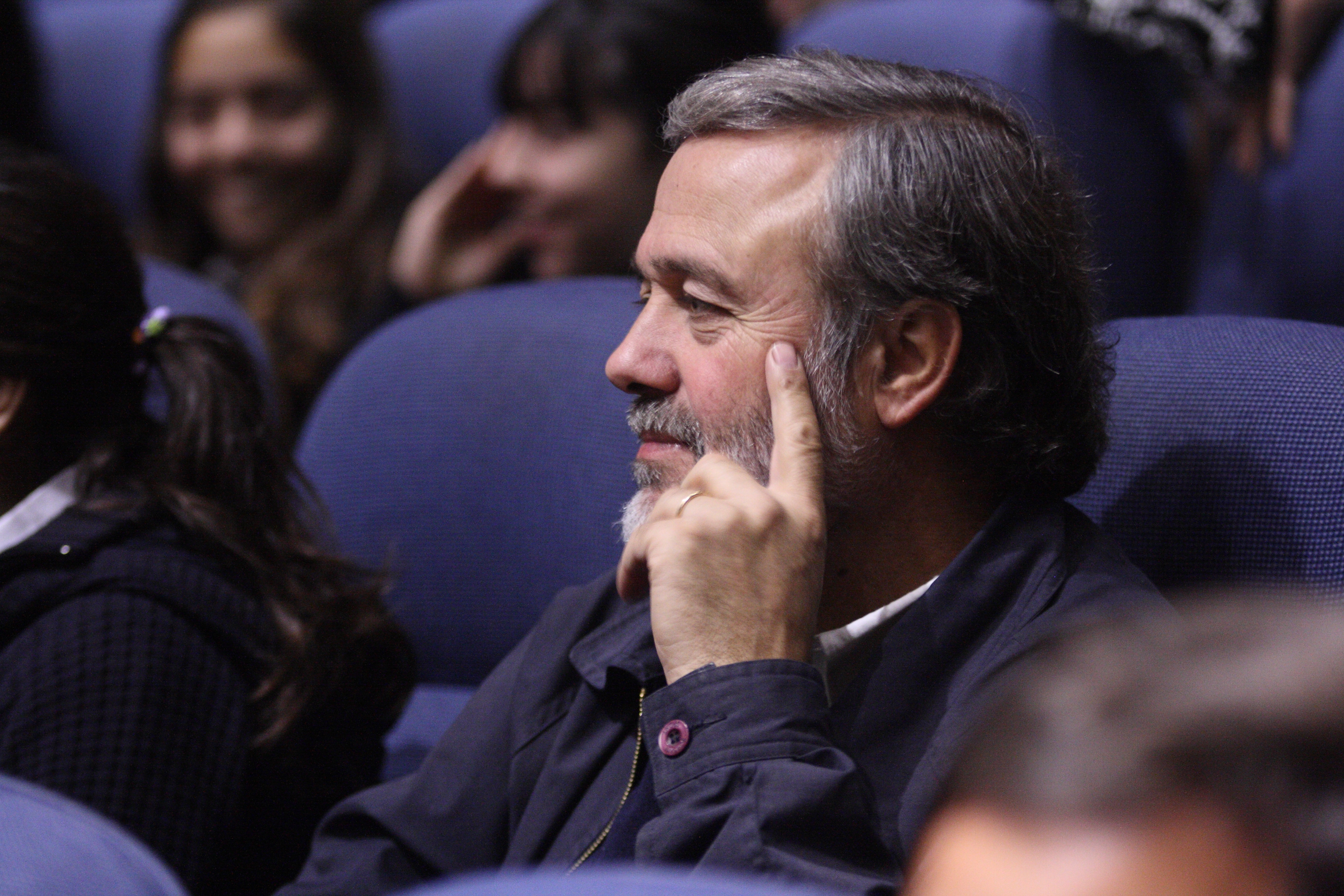

Member of the Constitutional Convention
- In office 4 July 2021 – 4 July 2022
- Constituency: 12th District

Personal details
- Born: 1 January 1959 (age 67) Santiago, Chile
- Other political affiliations: Non-Neutral Independents (2021–2022)
- Spouse: Lorena Cornejo
- Children: Six
- Relatives: Bruno Baranda (brother)
- Education: Pontifical Catholic University of Chile (B.Sc); Pontifical Lateran University (M.Sc); Comillas Pontifical University (Ph.D)
- Occupation: Constituent
- Profession: Psychologist

Benito Baranda Ferrán (born 1 January 1959) is a Chilean psychologist, sociologist, and independent politician.

He served as a member of the Constitutional Convention, representing the 12th District of the Metropolitan Region.

== Biography ==
Baranda was born on 1 January 1959 in Santiago, Chile. He is the son of Guillermo Baranda López and María Teresa Ferrán Ferrer.

He completed his primary and secondary education at Colegio San Ignacio El Bosque, graduating in 1976. In 1977, he entered the Pontifical Catholic University of Chile (PUC), where he earned a degree in Psychology.

He later obtained a Master of Science in Marriage and Family Studies from the Pontifical Lateran University in Rome, Italy, and a PhD in Sociology with a specialization in Social Exclusion from Comillas Pontifical University in Madrid, Spain.

Professionally, Baranda worked as a psychologist at the Faculty of Medicine of the Pontifical Catholic University of Chile and as a teacher at Colegio San Ignacio and the Pontifical Seminary. He joined Hogar de Cristo in 1981 and served as its Social Director between 1991 and 2011. He is currently the international director of the organization América Solidaria.

== Public career ==
Baranda has participated in various social organizations, including the Foundation for Overcoming Poverty, and served on the Presidential Advisory Commission of Experts for the Update of the Poverty Line and Extreme Poverty indicators. He is a member of the movement Independientes No Neutrales.

In the elections held on 15 and 16 May 2021, he ran as an independent candidate for the Constitutional Convention representing the 12th District of the Santiago Metropolitan Region, as part of the pact Independientes por una Nueva Constitución. He obtained 47,081 votes, corresponding to 12.65% of the valid votes cast, becoming the leading vote-getter in the district.
