= Urban Land Conservancy =

US non-profit organization

- Formation: 2003
- Founded: 2003
- Purpose: Acquire, develop and preserve real estate in urban areas for community benefit
- Headquarters: Denver, CO
- Location: Denver
- Region served: Denver metro area
- CEO, President: Aaron Miripol
- COO: Aaron Martinez
- CFO: Brad Dodson
- Board of directors: Matthew Barry, Dawn Burkhardt, Eric Duran, Michael Harris, Eugene Howard, Tim Howard, Grant Swanson, Creighton Ward, Tracy Winchester, David Younggren
- Website: https://www.urbanlandc.org/

Urban Land Conservancy (ULC), acquires, develops and holds real estate for long-term community benefit, focusing on preserving and delivering affordable residential and commercial properties in the Denver metro area.

== History ==
Urban Land Conservancy was established in 2003 with capital from the Gary-Williams Energy Corporation through the Piton Foundation, a philanthropic organization founded by Sam Gary. In 2007, the conservancy hired Aaron Miripol as its first outside president and CEO.

== Properties ==
ULC's properties include affordable housing, nonprofit facilities, schools, health centers and mixed-use developments. The buildings may be owned and leased by ULC, or held in a community land trust where ULC owns the land and another organization owns the building. ULC also engages in land banking for future development, and property covenants to ensure rents remain affordable.

=== Affordable Housing ===
ULC secures properties to be redeveloped or preserved as affordable housing. A community land trust is often used to ensure long-term affordability. Examples include South Platte Crossing Apartments in Commerce City, Colorado, The Irving at Mile High Vista in Denver, and Walnut Flats in Denver.

=== Nonprofit Space ===
ULC acquires and maintains properties to lease low-cost office and facility space to nonprofits and mission-minded organizations. These “nonprofit hubs” allow organizations to operate at below-market rates. Examples include Holly Square and the Tramway Nonprofit Center.

=== Schools and Educational Centers ===
ULC secures and develops properties for educational use, such as the New Legacy Charter School. They also partner on campuses that combine affordable housing with educational and job training opportunities, such as the Mosaic Community Campus.

=== Land Banking ===
ULC acquires vacant or underused land in transit corridors and vulnerable neighborhoods for future community-focused development. For example, ULC acquired parcels at 40th and Colorado Boulevard adjacent to a Regional Transportation District (RTD) station for a mixed-use affordable housing development.

=== Health Centers ===
ULC owns land that houses community health clinics, such as the Tepeyac Community Health Center and the Center for African American Health.

=== Mixed-use Commercial and Community Spaces ===
ULC's community land trust model allows ULC to retain land for facilities that feature more than one property type, including a mix of affordable housing, nonprofit office space and small retail businesses that support the community. Examples include the Vina Apartments, nonprofit and retail uses at 48th and Race; and Meade Street Gardens in the Denver neighborhood of Westwood.

== Practices ==
ULC utilizes a variety of real estate practices, including land banking - the practice of acquiring parcels of land for future development. They also use a community land trust (CLT) model with a 99-year, renewable ground lease to circumvent the affordability expirations imposed by the city and federal Low-Income Housing Tax Credits (LIHTC). In addition, ULC supports sustainable energy practices in its development projects, such as at the Oxford Vista Campus in the city of Aurora.

== Funding ==
Urban Land Conservancy has partnered with a variety of organizations to raise funding for land development along with receiving money from the Low-Income Housing Tax Credit and the Colorado Housing and Finance Authority, which provide funding for affordable housing programs.

=== Denver Transit Oriented Development Fund (TOD) ===
ULC, Enterprise Community Partners and the City and County of Denver partnered to establish the nation's first Transit Oriented Development fund. The revolving loan fund makes capital available to acquire and hold land for the development or preservation of affordable housing for up to five years along current and proposed transit corridors.

The TOD fund was created to develop and preserve 1,000 affordable homes along current and future transit corridors in Denver. Sites purchased through the fund are within one-half mile of fixed-rail transit stations or one-quarter mile of high-frequency bus stops.

=== Metro Denver Impact Facility (MDIF) ===
ULC, in partnership with FirstBank, The Colorado Health Foundation (CHF), The Denver Foundation (TDF) and the Colorado Housing and Finance Authority (CHFA), created the MDIF as a revolving fund in order to invest in land projects in the Denver area. ULC is the sole borrower, and was responsible for creating the development plan and permanent financing structure.

== See also ==
- Urban planning
- Green development
- Real estate development
- Land-use planning
- Property preservation
- Transit-oriented development
