= University of Development =

Chilean private university

Universidad del Desarrollo
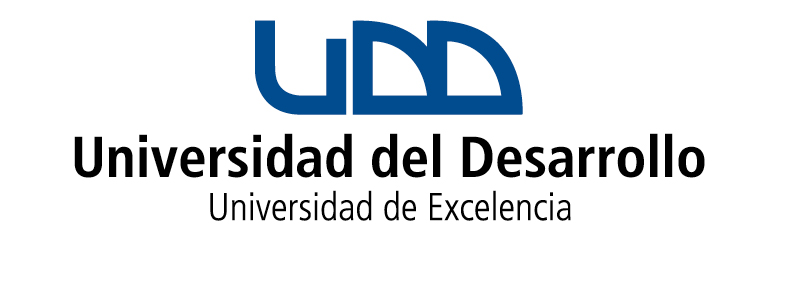
- Motto: Universidad de Exelencia
- Motto in English: University of Excellence
- Type: Private
- Established: 1990
- President: Federico Valdés
- Students: 15,994
- Undergraduates: 14,880
- Postgraduates: 1,114
- Location: 680 La Plaza Ave, Las Condes, Santiago, Chile, Chile; 33.3916117°S 70.50113104°W
- Colors: Blue and white
- Website: udd.cl
- Location in Chile

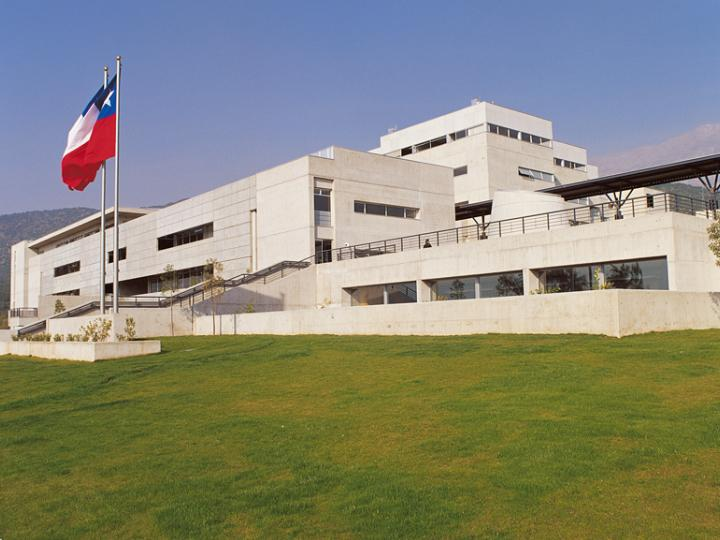
San Carlos de Apoquindo campus in Santiago, Chile.

University of Development (Spanish: Universidad del Desarrollo) is a Chilean private university. Its main campus is in Santiago de Chile, with a secondary campus in Concepción.

== History ==
The University was founded in Concepción in 1990, in the residence of a well known family, located in the Trinitarias Street in downtown Concepción. Its founders were Joaquín Lavín, Carlos Délano, Ernesto Silva, Cristián Larroulet, Hernán Büchi and Federico Valdés.

The first degree given was in Business Administration (Ingeniería comercial). The following year, architecture, journalism were added and a law school opened.

In 1993, its main campus was inaugurated. The following year programs for industrial engineering and social sciences were opened. In 1997, the university gained autonomy from the Catholic University of Chile. Two years later, the university opened a new campus, while absorbing the Universidad de Las Condes, and its student body.

In 2001, the university inaugurated its new campus in San Carlos de Apoquindo, where most of the faculties are. Notable exceptions, are the Medical School and the Drama School, both of which are in the old Universidad de Las Condes house.

In 2006, the university opened its newest building for the Health Area Faculties in Concepción; located less than one block away from the main campus.

== Rankings ==
UDD's MBA faculty was ranked first in Latin America by América Economía, one of Latin America's most important business magazines. Its MBA program was also ranked 12th among all Latin American business schools. América Economía magazine also ranked UDD in first place in developing entrepreneurship and leading abilities to its students within Latin American universities.

In 2017 UDD's Medicine School was ranked second in Chile in the national medical exam, surpassing most traditional universities in Chile. Besides, UDD is currently ranked as the best private university in Chile, standing 5th overall, according to the national CNAP accreditation program.

== Sports ==
UDD features football, hockey, volleyball, rodeo, debate, tennis and basketball teams, competing within higher education leagues and championships.

== Accreditation ==
The University applied and got accreditation for five years in 2006, in the areas of Institutional Management, Degree-Conducing Teaching, Vinculation with the Environment, and Continuous Education.

== Schools and careers ==
- Faculty of Architecture, Arts and Design
  - Architecture
  - Environments and Objects Design
  - Digital Design
  - Graphic Design
- Faculty of Communications
  - Journalism
  - Drama
  - Advertising
  - Cinema
- Law School
  - Law
- Faculty of Business and Economy
  - Business Administration (Ingeniería Comercial)
  - Administration Execution Engineering
- Faculty of Humanities and Social Studies
  - Baccalaureate in Science
  - Baccalaureate in Humanities and Social Studies
- Faculty of Government
  - Political Sciences
- Faculty of Engineering
  - Industrial Engineering
  - Civil Engineering
  - Mining Engineering
  - Geology (Earth Science)
- Faculty of Health
  - Medicine
  - Medical Technologies
  - Speech-language pathology
  - Kinesiology
  - Nutrition and Dietetics
  - Odontology
- Faculty of Psychology
  - Psychology
- Faculty of Education
  - Pedagogy

== Notable faculty members ==
- Klaus Schmidt-Hebbel
