= Giorgio Jackson =

Chilean politician and engineer

Giorgio Jackson Drago
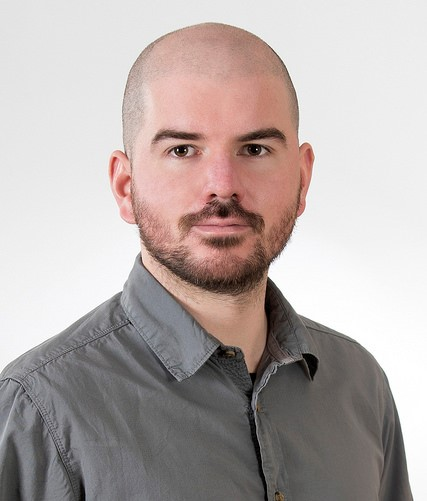
- Giorgio Jackson in 2018

Minister of Social Development
- In office 6 September 2022 – 11 August 2023
- President: Gabriel Boric
- Preceded by: Paula Poblete

Minister Secretary-General of the Presidency
- In office 11 March 2022 – 6 September 2022
- President: Gabriel Boric
- Preceded by: Juan José Ossa
- Succeeded by: Ana Lya Uriarte

Member of the Chamber of Deputies of Chile, District 10 (Santiago, Providencia, Ñuñoa, Macul, San Joaquín and La Granja)
- In office 11 March 2014 – 11 March 2022
- Preceded by: Felipe Harboe

President of the Pontifical Catholic University of Chile Student Federation
- In office 26 November 2010 – 25 November 2011
- Preceded by: Joaquín Walker
- Succeeded by: Noam Titelman

Personal details
- Born: Kenneth Giorgio Jackson Drago; February 6, 1987 (age 39) Viña del Mar, Chile
- Party: Frente Amplio (Chilean political party) (2024-present); Democratic Revolution (2013-2024)
- Occupation: Congressman
- Profession: Industrial engineer
- Committees: Science and Technology, Treasure
- Website: giorgiojackson.cl

Kenneth Giorgio Jackson Drago (born 6 February 1987) is a Chilean politician and engineer who was Chile's Minister of Social Development from 6 September 2022 until 11 August 2023. He previously held the position of Ministry General Secretariat of the Presidency between March and September 2022. He is the founder and first congressman of the Democratic Revolution political party, achieving the highest personal vote in the 2017 elections to the lower chamber. He was one of the leaders of the student protests of 2011 and collaborated in the creation of the Chilean Broad Front and the presidential candidacy of Beatriz Sánchez.

After the protests of 2011, Jackson and other social activists and student leaders called for the founding of a political movement that became the Democratic Revolution party. In the 2013 general election, he was elected as a deputy for Santiago Centro. In the 2017 general election, he was elected as a deputy for the new District 10, which includes the communes of Ñuñoa, Providencia, Santiago, Macul, San Joaquín, La Granja. He has maintained high approval ratings in public opinion polls. During his time as minister in the government of President Gabriel Boric, the Criteria poll showed a decrease in Jackson's approval ratings from 48% in March 2022 to 37% in September of the same year.

== Biography ==
Jackson was born in Viña del Mar, Chile, on 6 February 1987, son of Kenneth Paul Jackson Salinas and Carmen Gloria Elisa Drago Caballero. Jackson studied at the Deutsche Schule Sankt Thomas Morus, a private school located in the Santiago commune of Providencia.

In the third year of middle school, Jackson participated as a volunteer in Un Techo para Chile an organization in which he would be involved for six years. During his adolescence, he played volleyball, and was a member of the national team for the 2004 Minors, and 2006 Youth categories.

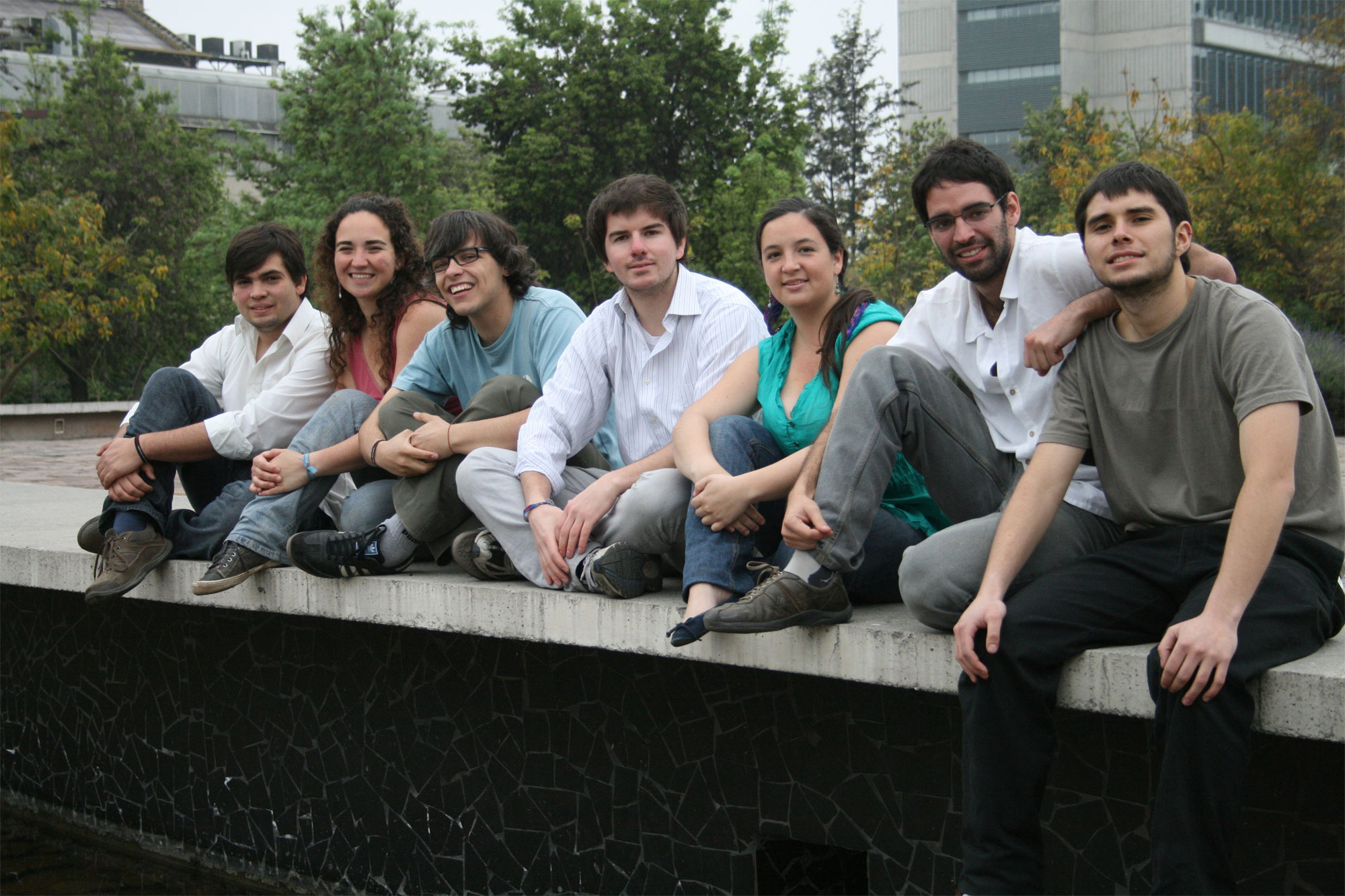
Jackson with the other members of the FEUC directive board of 2010–11.

In 2004, he began studying civil industrial engineering with a major in information technologies at the Pontifical Catholic University of Chile, graduating in 2013. In 2009 he participated in the creation of the Student and Worker Center of the Catholic University (CET), an initiative that emerged from the New University Action (NAU) movement. He was general coordinator of CET between 2009 and 2010.

=== Political career ===
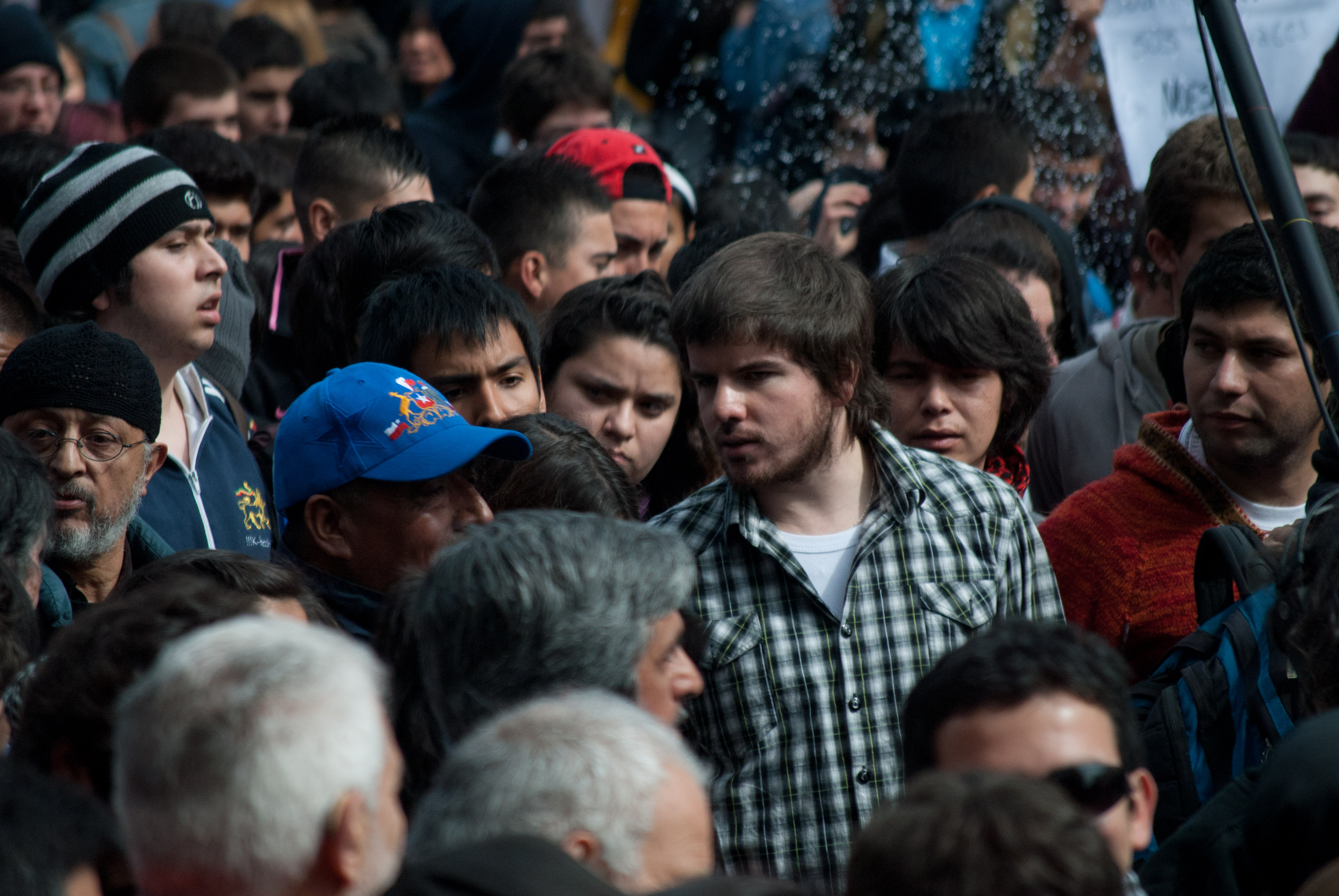
Jackson in a student march.

In 2008, Jackson joined the center-left student movement New University Action (NAU). As president of the Student Federation of the Catholic University, he was one of the main leaders of the student movement during 2011 along with the president of the Student Federation of the University of Chile, Camila Vallejo, and the president of the Federation of Students of the University of Santiago de Chile, Camilo Ballesteros. In his role as spokesperson of the Confederation of Students of Chile (Confech), Jackson was one of the most critical of the proposals of the government of Sebastián Piñera.

Jackson intervened in various official meetings, one of the most important of which was held in front of the Education Commission of the Senate of Chile, where he argued for "a moral imperative that the State be a guarantor of rights and not consumer goods". He also made a trip to Europe together with Camila Vallejo and Francisco Figueroa, where they spoke to the United Nations Educational, Scientific and Cultural Organization (UNESCO).

Jackson avoided referring to a future political career during the protests of 2011, stating that it was not in his immediate plans. However, on January 7, 2012 he launched a political movement called the Democratic Revolution.

In December 2012, he announced that he would run as a candidate for deputy for Santiago in the 2013 parliamentary elections. Although he ran as an independent candidate, he was supported by the Nueva Mayoría centre-left parties, which decided not to run candidates for the district. Jackson chose to have a campaign funded exclusively by his supporters, excluding corporate and anonymous donations. On November 17, he was elected as a deputy with 48.17% of the votes of his district. Jackson is one of the four student leaders who were elected deputies in those elections, along with Camila Vallejo, Gabriel Boric and Karol Cariola. On November 21, he declared his support for the candidacy of Michelle Bachelet on behalf of the Democratic Revolution party.

=== Deputy and Broad Front (2014-present) ===
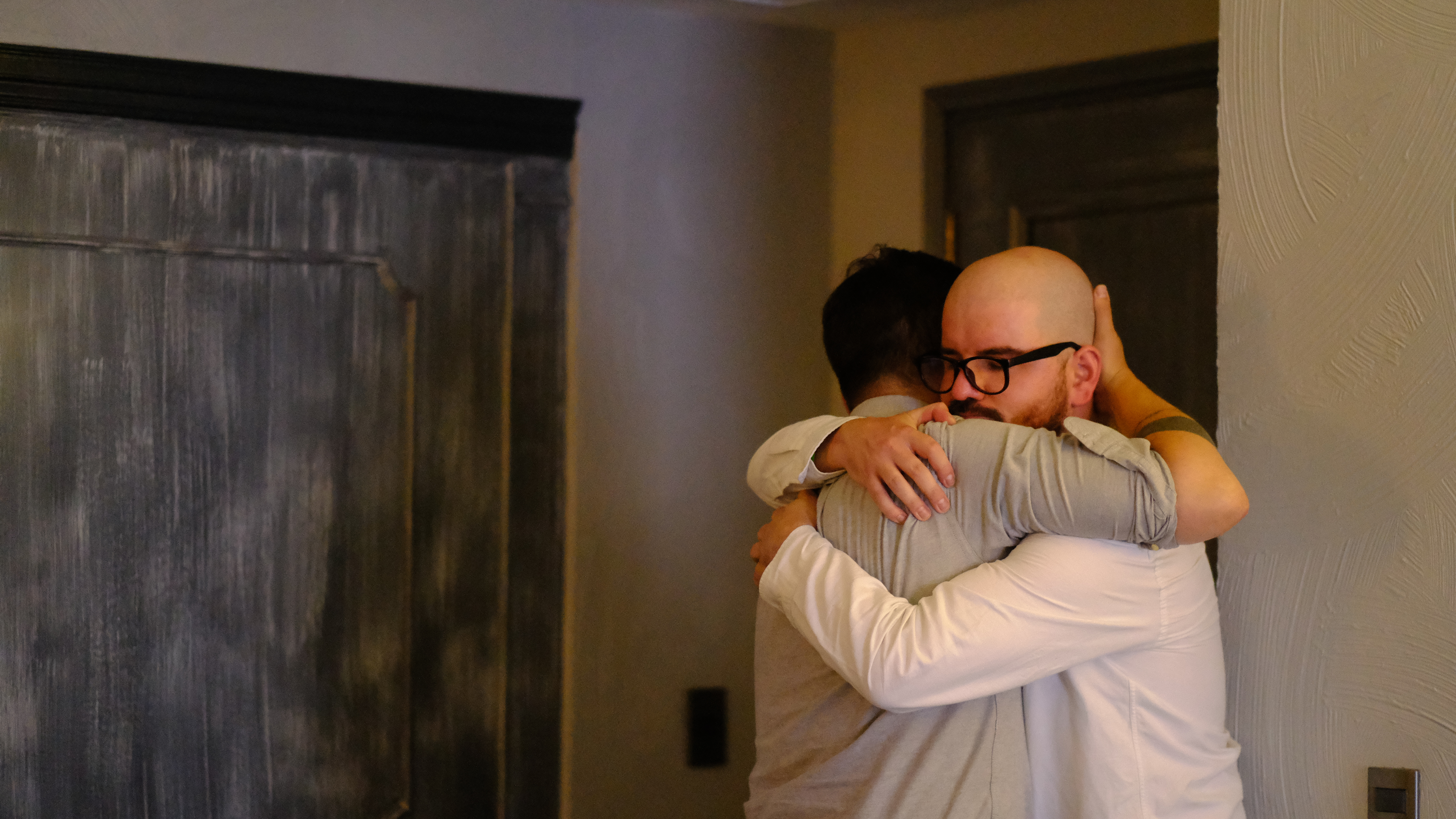
Giorgio Jackson celebrating with Gabriel Boric after Boric's election as President of Chile in 2021.

Jackson took up his position as deputy on March 11, 2014. In the Congress he sat on the Permanent Commissions of Education. He also participated in the Citizen Security Commission, managing the creation of a commission investigating the role of the police in the most vulnerable sectors of the country.

From 2016 onwards, Jackson has played a role in the construction of Broad Front, a coalition of various leftist political forces and citizen movements which was founded for the parliamentary and presidential elections in 2017, and supported the presidential candidacy of Beatriz Sánchez.

In the elections of November 19, 2017, Jackson retained his seat with the most votes of any deputy. He said on a number of occasions that he would not stand for a third term.

Jackson was the head of Gabriel Boric's 2021 presidential election campaign. Following Boric's victory, Jackson was mentioned as a possible Interior Minister.

== Electoral record ==
2013 Parliamentary District 22 Deputies Elections (Santiago Centro)

Candidate	Coalition	Party	Votes	%	Results
Giorgio Jackson Drago	Independent	IND	55 060	48,17	Deputy
Felipe Kast Sommerhoff	Alianza	ILJ	22 338	19,54	Deputy
Mónica Zalaquett Said	Alianza	UDI	21 265	18,60	
Mario Schilling Fuenzalida	Si tú quieres, Chile cambia	ILI	5468	4,78	
Eduardo Contreras Marín	Nueva Constitución para Chile	IGUAL	4349	3,80	
Cristián Orellana Álvarez	Partido Humanista	PH	3226	2,82	
Octavio González Ojeda	Partido Humanista	PH	1457	1,27	
Rony Núñez Mesquida	Si tú quieres, Chile cambia	ILI	1129	0,98	
