= Liliana Jadue =

Chilean politician and surgeon

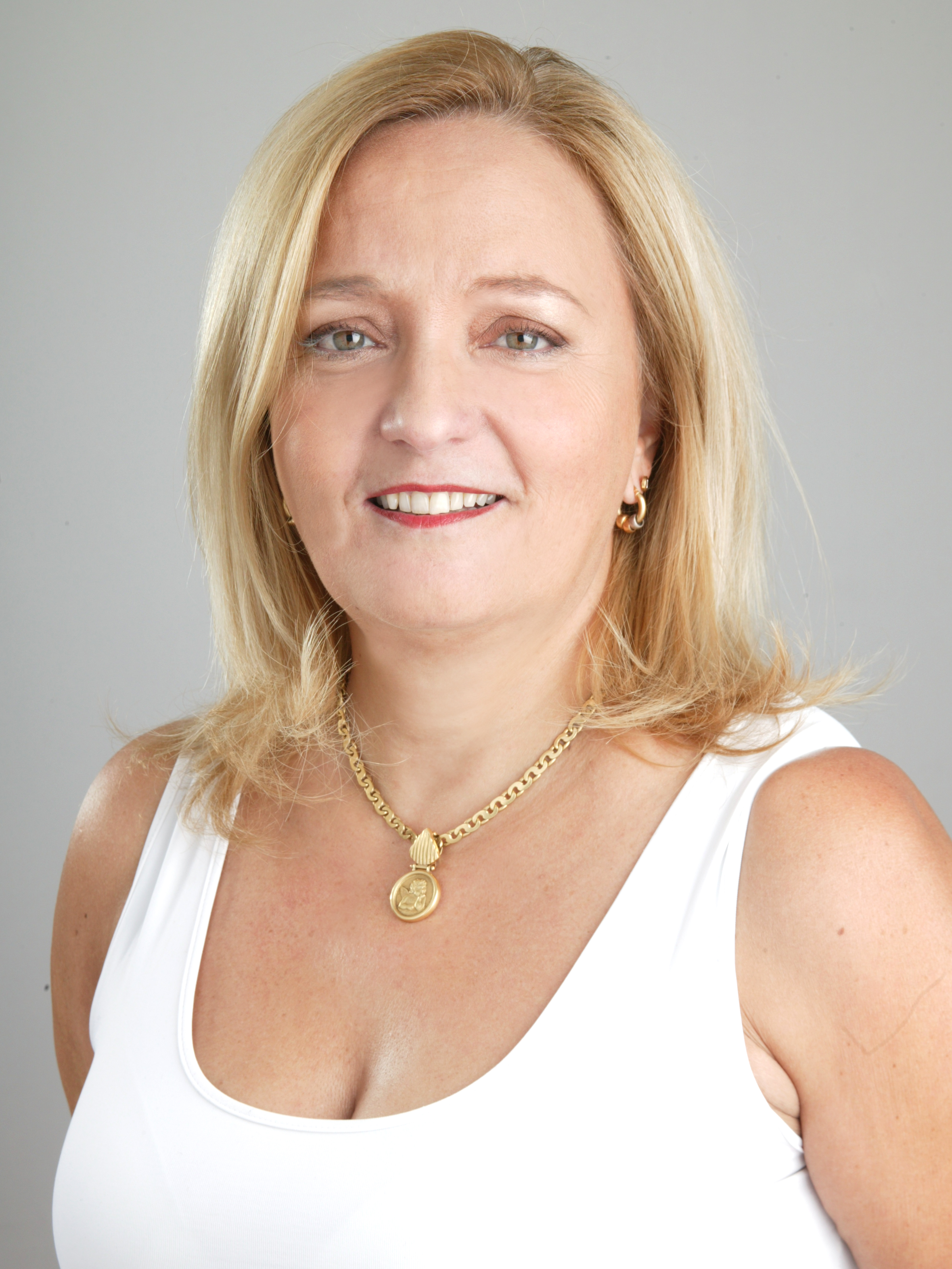

Undersecretary of Public Health of Chile
- In office March 11, 2010 – January 24, 2011
- President: Sebastián Piñera
- Preceded by: Jeannette Vega
- Succeeded by: Jorge Diaz Anaiz

Personal details
- Born: 1960 (61-62 years old)
- Party: Independent, close to Evópoli
- Education: Catholic University of Chile
- Occupation: Medical surgeon and politician

Liliana Soraya Josefina Jadue Hund is a Chilean politician and surgeon, she served as Undersecretary of Public Health of her country under the first government of Sebastián Piñera.

== Education ==
She completed her higher studies in the career of medical surgeon at the Pontificia Universidad Católica (PUC) and then studied for a master's in public health, mentioned in epidemiology at the University of Chile.

In 2001 she received a Fulbright Scholarship School of Public Health at Harvard University.

She has practiced her profession in the public and private sectors, being an advisor to the Health Reform Commission and a consultant to the Ministry of Health, the Pan American Health Organization (PAHO), among other organizations.

== Career ==
In February 2010, she was announced by President-elect Sebastián Piñera as Undersecretary of Public Health, officially taking office on March 11, 2010, with the start of the administration. She resigned from his position on January 24, 2011, after differences with the Minister of Health Jaime Mañalich, among those frictions that triggered his resignation, was the outbreak of the case of the presence of pesticides in the laundry for children and older adults.

In 2021, she was part of the medical team of the presidential candidate Ignacio Briones, facing the primaries of Chile Vamos in July of that year.

Currently, she works as a specialist in public health at the National Autonomous Corporation for the Certification of Medical Specialties (Conacem). In parallel, she serves as director of the Master in Health Management at the Universidad del Desarrollo (UDD).
