= Lidia Amarales =

Chilean politician and surgeon

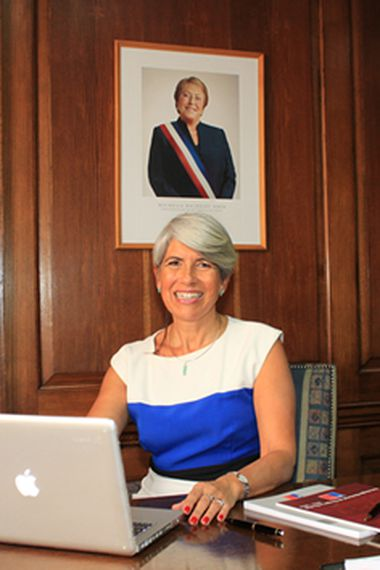

National Director of the National Service for the Prevention and Rehabilitation of Drug and Alcohol Consumption of Chile
- In office 20 May 2014 – 10 April 2015
- President: Michelle Bachelet
- Preceded by: Francisca Florenzano Valdés
- Succeeded by: Mariano Montenegro Corona

Undersecretary of Public Health of Chile
- In office 11 March 2006 – 14 January 2008
- President: Michelle Bachelet
- Preceded by: Cecilia Villavicencio Rosas
- Succeeded by: Jeannette Vega Morales

Personal details
- Born: September 2, 1953 (age 73) Providencia, Chile
- Party: Party for Democracy (2000 - 2018); Communist Party (1969 - 1986)
- Spouse: Eric Román Carrasco (m. 1978)
- Education: University of Chile
- Occupation: Surgeon and politician

Lidia Magdalena Amarales Osorio is a Chilean politician, surgeon, and Master in Public Health. She is a former member of the Party for Democracy (PPD) and the Communist Party of Chile (PC). She served as Undersecretary of Public Health of her country during the first government of Michelle Bachelet between 2006 and 2008, and as National Director of the National Service for the Prevention and Rehabilitation of Drug and Alcohol Consumption of Chile (SENDA) between 2014 and 2015..

== Early life and education ==
She was born in Santiago de Chile, the daughter of Dr. Jorge Amarales Aspinall and Marta Lidia Osorio Perich. At the age of 7 she moved with her family to the city of Punta Arenas, where she completed her primary and secondary studies at the Liceo de Niñas de Punta Arenas. She completed her higher studies in Medicine at the University of Chile in Santiago between 1971 and 1978, and then specialized as a pediatrician in 1984 and as a pediatric bronchopulmonary specialist in 2004. Training for this last subspecialty was carried out at the Academic Hospital of the Free University of Brussels, Belgium. Between 2008 and 2011 she completed a master's degree in public health at the University of Chile.

She married in Santiago in 1978 to the gynecologist Eric Román Carrasco, who became a councilor of the Punta Arenas municipality between 2005 and 2008. Together they have three children: Javiera (1980), Gabriela (1984) and Alonso (1987).

In 1969 she was elected Snow Queen during the first edition of the Punta Arenas Winter Carnival, defeating Vivianne Blanlot on that occasion.

== Professional career ==
She worked as a surgeon, paediatrician and children's bronchopulmonary doctor for more than 20 years in the Pediatrics and Children's Bronchopulmonary units of the Dr Lautaro Navarro Avaria Clinical Hospital of Magallanes. She served as head and coordinator of the "Acute Respiratory Infections" (ARI) program there. In her professional career, between 1994 and 2011, she was co-investigator and coordinator in Punta Arenas of the "International Study of Asthma and Allergies" project. Children» (ISAAC), sponsored by the World Health Organization (WHO).

Later, under the government of President Ricardo Lagos, she was in charge of the Regional Ministerial Secretariat (Seremi) of Health of the Magallanes and Chilean Antarctica Region. Likewise, during the first government of Michelle Bachelet, she served as head of the Undersecretary of Public Health between 2006 and 2008. It was in that role that the "Tobacco Law" (n° 20,105) was implemented in August 2006.

For the second government of Michelle Bachelet, she was appointed as national director of the National Service for the Prevention and Rehabilitation of Drug and Alcohol Consumption (SENDA), dependent on the Ministry of the Interior and Public Security. After that, she became co-founder of the "Chile Libre de Tabaco Foundation."

Since 2022, she has been an associate professor at the University of Magallanes, assuming the position of assistant director of care at the Teaching and Research Care Center of the high house of studies. In 2023, she was appointed president and advisor of the AUGE-GES Explicit Guarantees Advisory Council for the period 2023-2026.

== Political career ==
In her youth, she was a member of the Communist Youth of Chile (JJ.CC.) during the Popular Unity government of Salvador Allende. When the coup d'état of September 11, 1973, occurred, she was detained and tortured for several weeks along with classmates from the medical school in the detention centre of the El Bosque Specialty School of the Air Force, and later in the General Mackenna Public Prison. Soon after, in a summary trial at the University of Chile, she was sentenced to repeat a full year of her medical degree charged with being "subversive". Today, she appears as a victim of political imprisonment and torture in the Valech Report.

Between 1990 and 1997 she was co-founder and spokesperson for the NGO "Defensa del Bosque Nativo Magallánico" in defense of the native Magellan forest against indiscriminate exploitation. Together with the NGO, she presented protection appeals in the Court of Appeals of the Region, and subsequently sentenced by the Supreme Court in 1997, initially against the Empresa Magallánica de Bosques (1990-1995), which led to the end of the chip projects in Bahía Catalina in the city of Punta Arenas and later against the "Río Cóndor" project that the Forest Company Trillium Ltda intended to carry out.

In 2005, she was a candidate for the Chilean Congress representing Magallanes and Chilean Antarctica Region, but she was not elected with 21.4% of the votes. Since 2010 she has been co-founder and spokesperson for the NGO "Chile Libre de Tabaco" and the "Citizen Table on Tobacco and Health" which promote public and legislative policies in favor of greater control of smoking in Chile.
