= University of Las Condes =

University in Chile

- Universidad Las Condes
- Type: Private
- Active: December 29, 1987–1999
- Location: Santiago, Chile

University of Las Condes (Spanish: Universidad Las Condes) was a Chilean private university.

It was founded in 1987 by retired Carabineros de Chile General César Mendoza and other investors. Mendoza was the president of the university's superior council until his death in 1996. In 1999, the university went through an economic crisis, which forced its owners to sell and merge it with Universidad del Desarrollo.
