= Ministry of National Assets =

Government ministry of Chile

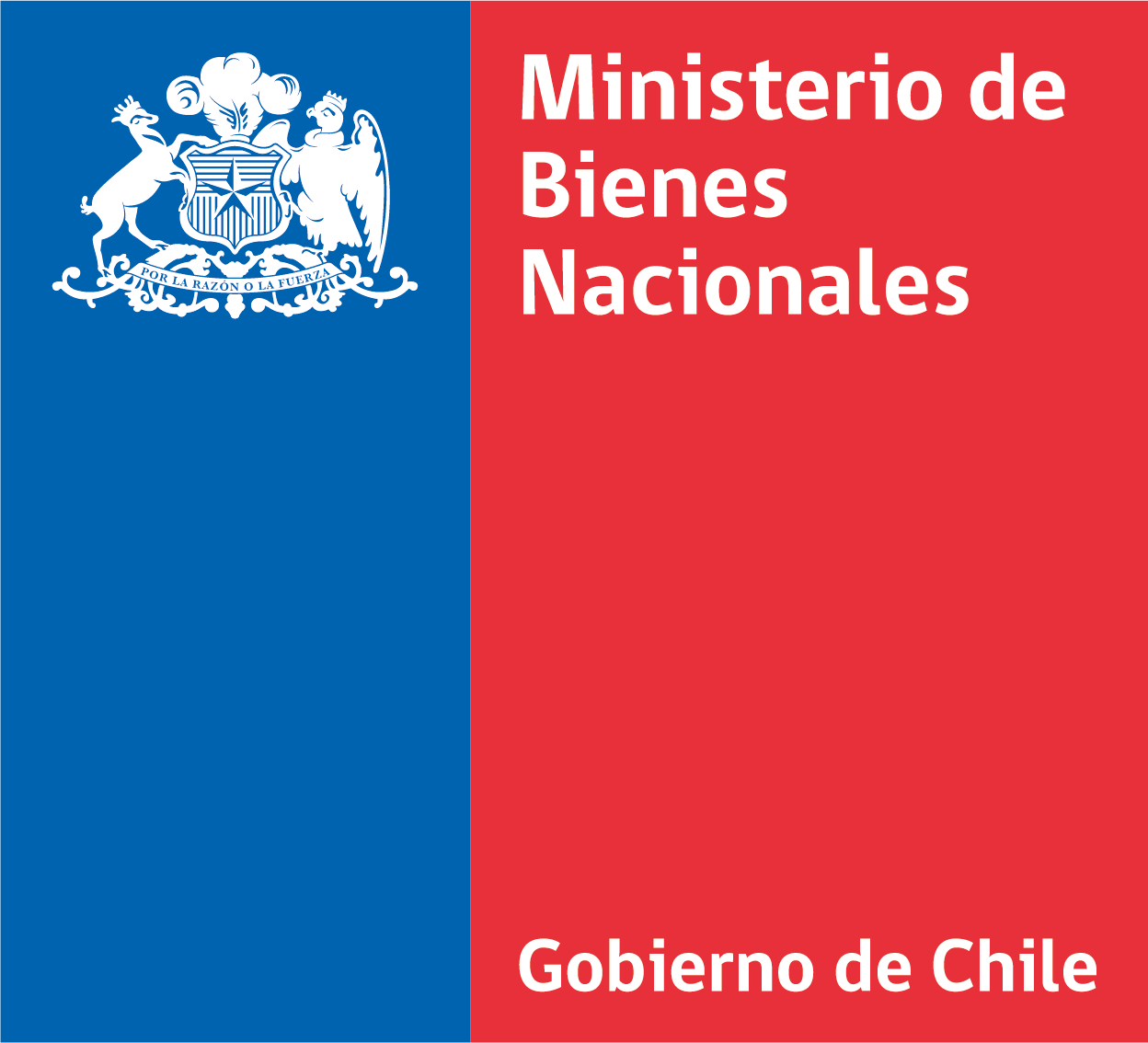
Logo

The Ministry of National Assets (Spanish: Ministerio de Bienes Nacionales, MBN) is a cabinet-level ministry of the Government of Chile responsible for the administration and management of state-owned property. Its core functions include overseeing public lands, regulating small real estate ownership, and ensuring proper use of national assets held for public use. Through territorial planning, legal regularization, and public information systems, the ministry contributes to Chile's social, economic, and environmental development.

The current minister is Catalina Parot, while the Undersecretary of National Assets is Javier Peró Ovalle.

== History ==
In 1871, under Federico Errázuriz Zañartu's government (1871−1876), it was created the Ministry of Foreign Relations and Colonization to order the occupation of the southern lands. When the inhabitants settled in the south of Chile, the State assumed a new role aimed at the administration of fiscal assets, the conservation of heritage and the exploitation of natural benefits.

In 1888, preserving the same attributes, this ministry took the name of «Foreign Relations, Worship and Colonization». As a result of the numerous problems between settlers and indigenous people due to questions of legality over the dominion of the existing property, the Austral Property Ministry was created in 1930. Its mission was to be in charge of the colonization/occupation policies south of the Malleco River. In the same year the Department of National Assets and Colonization was established under the freshly formed Ministry of Austral Property. Its mission was to manage the public lands to deliver them —with absolute legal knowledge— to the settlers of southern Chile.

In 1977, with the DL N°1939 of Augusto Pinochet's regime, it was created the Ministry of Lands and Colonization, which shortly after, on 5 June 1980, adopted the current name of «Ministry of National Assets». Similarly, its functions were redefined, being adapted to the new social, economic and political reality of Chile.

== List of Ministers ==
Minister	Start	End	Party	President
Catalina Parot	11 March 2026	Incumbent	Evópoli	José Antonio Kast
