= Asbestos =

Carcinogenic fibrous silicate mineral

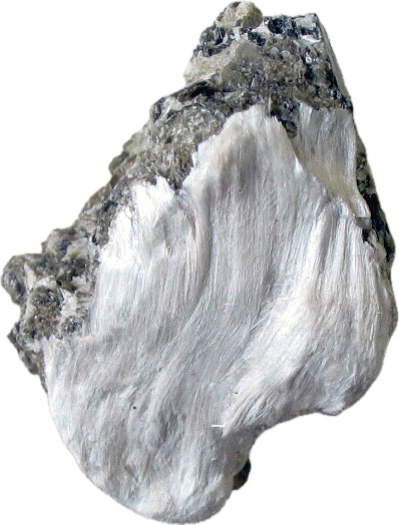
- Fibrous tremolite asbestos on muscovite

General
- Category: Silicate minerals
- Strunz classification: 09.ED.15
- Dana classification: 71.01.02d.03
- Crystal system: Orthorhombic, monoclinic

Identification
- Formula mass: 277.11 g
- Color: Green, Red, White, Grey
- Crystal habit: Amorphous, granular, massive
- Cleavage: Prismatic
- Fracture: Fibrous
- Mohs scale hardness: 2.5-3.0
- Luster: Silky
- Streak: White
- Specific gravity: 2.4–3.3
- Optical properties: Biaxial
- Refractive index: 1.53–1.72
- Birefringence: 0.008
- 2V angle: 20° to 60°
- Dispersion: Relatively weak
- Extinction: Parallel or oblique
- Ultraviolet fluorescence: Non-fluorescent
- Melting point: 400 to 1,040 °C (752 to 1,904 °F)

Asbestos or asbestus (/æsˈbɛstəs, æz-, -tɒs/ ass-BES-təs, az-, -toss) is a group of naturally occurring, fibrous silicate minerals that have been used for thousands of years to create flexible fire-resistant objects, such as fireproof fabrics. It is toxic and carcinogenic.

There are six types, all of which are composed of long and thin fibrous crystals, with each fibre (particulate with length substantially greater than width) composed of many microscopic "fibrils" that can be released into the atmosphere by abrasion and other processes. Inhalation of asbestos fibres can lead to various dangerous lung conditions, including mesothelioma, asbestosis, and lung cancer. As a result of these health effects, asbestos is considered a serious health and safety hazard.

Archaeological studies have found evidence of asbestos being used as far back as the Stone Age to strengthen ceramic pots, but large-scale mining began at the end of the 19th century when manufacturers and builders began using asbestos for its desirable physical properties. Asbestos is an excellent thermal and electrical insulator, and is highly fire-resistant, so for much of the 20th century, it was very commonly used around the world as a building material (particularly for its fire-retardant properties), until its adverse effects on human health were more widely recognized and acknowledged in the 1970s. Many buildings constructed before the 1980s contain asbestos.

The use of asbestos for construction and fireproofing has been made illegal in many countries. Despite this, around 255,000 people are thought to die each year from diseases related to asbestos exposure. In part, this is because many older buildings still contain asbestos; in addition, the consequences of exposure can take decades to arise. The latency period (from exposure until the diagnosis of negative health effects) is typically 20 years. The most common diseases associated with chronic asbestos exposure are asbestosis (scarring of the lungs due to asbestos inhalation) and mesothelioma (a type of cancer).

Many developing countries still use asbestos as a building material, and asbestos mining continues, with the top producer, Russia, producing an estimated 790,000 tonnes in 2020.

== History ==
Asbestos has been used for thousands of years to create flexible objects that resist fire, such as napkins and other textiles. Mass production of asbestos-containing consumer goods began in the modern era. Today, the risk of asbestos has been recognized; the use of asbestos is completely banned in 66 countries and strictly regulated in many others.

=== Terminology ===
The word "asbestos", first used in the 1600s, ultimately derives from the Ancient Greek: ἄσβεστος, meaning "unquenchable" or "inextinguishable". The name reflects use of the substance for wicks that would never burn up.

It was adopted into English via the Old French abestos, which derived the word from Greek via Latin, but in the original Greek, "asbestos" actually referred to quicklime. It is said by the Oxford English Dictionary that the word was wrongly used by Pliny the Elder for what is now called asbestos, and that he popularized the misnomer. Asbestos was originally referred to in Greek as amiantos, meaning "undefiled", because when thrown into a fire it came out unmarked. "Amiantos" is the source for the word for asbestos in many languages, such as the Portuguese, the Spanish, and the Italian amianto and the French amiante. It had also been called "amiant" in English in the early 15th century, but this usage was superseded by "asbestos". The word is pronounced /æsˈbɛstəs/ or /æsˈbɛstɒs/.

=== Early references and uses ===
Asbestos use dates back at least 4,500 years, when the inhabitants of the Lake Juojärvi region in East Finland strengthened earthenware pots and cooking utensils with the asbestos mineral anthophyllite; archaeologists call this style of pottery "asbestos-ceramic". Some archaeologists believe that ancient peoples made shrouds of asbestos, wherein they burned the bodies of their kings to preserve only their ashes and to prevent the ashes being mixed with those of wood or other combustible materials commonly used in funeral pyres. Others assert that these peoples used asbestos to make perpetual wicks for sepulchral or other lamps. A famous example is the golden lamp asbestos lychnis, which the sculptor Callimachus made for the Erechtheion. In more recent centuries, asbestos was indeed used for this purpose.

A once-purported first description of asbestos occurs in Theophrastus, On Stones, from around 300 BC, but this identification has been refuted. In both modern and ancient Greek, the usual name for the material known in English as "asbestos" is amiantos ("undefiled", "pure"), which was adapted into the French as amiante and into Italian, Spanish and Portuguese as amianto. In modern Greek, the word ἀσβεστος or ασβέστης stands consistently and solely for lime.

The term asbestos is traceable to Roman naturalist Pliny the Elder's first-century manuscript Natural History and his use of the term asbestinon, meaning "unquenchable"; he described the mineral as being more expensive than pearls. While Pliny or his nephew Pliny the Younger is popularly credited with recognising the detrimental effects of asbestos on human beings, examination of the primary sources reveals no support for either claim.

In China, accounts of obtaining huǒ huàn bù (火浣布) or "fire-laundered cloth" certainly date to the Wei dynasty (386-535 AD), and there are claims they were known as early as in the Zhou dynasty, though not substantiated except in writings thought to date much later (see huoshu or "fire rat").

Athanasius of Alexandria, a Christian bishop living in 4th-century Egypt, references asbestos in one of his writings. Around the year 318, he wrote as follows:

The natural property of fire is to burn. Suppose, then, that there was a substance such as the Indian asbestos is said to be, which had no fear of being burnt, but rather displayed the impotence of the fire by proving itself unburnable. If anyone doubted the truth of this, all he need do would be to wrap himself up in the substance in question and then touch the fire.

Wealthy Persians amazed guests by cleaning a cloth by exposing it to fire. For example, according to Tabari, one of the curious items belonging to Khosrow II Parviz, the great Sassanian king (r. 590–628), was a napkin (Persian: منديل) that he cleaned simply by throwing it into the fire. Such cloth is believed to have been made of asbestos imported over the Hindu Kush. According to Biruni in his book Gems, any cloths made of asbestos (Persian: آذرشست, āzarshost) were called shostakeh (Persian: شستكه). Some Persians believed the fiber was the fur of an animal called the samandar (Persian: سمندر), which lived in fire and died when exposed to water; this was where the former belief originated that the salamander could tolerate fire. Charlemagne, the first Holy Roman Emperor (800–814), is also said to have possessed such a tablecloth.

Marco Polo recounts having been shown, in a place he calls Ghinghin talas, "a good vein from which the cloth which we call of salamander, which cannot be burnt if it is thrown into the fire, is made ..."

=== Industrial era ===
Industrial scale asbestos mining began in 1878 in Thetford township, Quebec. By 1895, mining was increasingly mechanized.

The large-scale asbestos industry began in the mid-19th century. Early attempts at producing asbestos paper and cloth in Italy began in the 1850s but failed to create a market for these products. Canadian asbestos samples were displayed in London in 1862, and the first companies were formed in England and Scotland to exploit this resource. Asbestos was first used in the manufacture of yarn, and German industrialist Louis Wertheim adopted this process in his factories in Germany. In 1871, the Patent Asbestos Manufacturing Company was established in Glasgow, and during the following decades, the Clydebank area became a centre for the nascent industry.

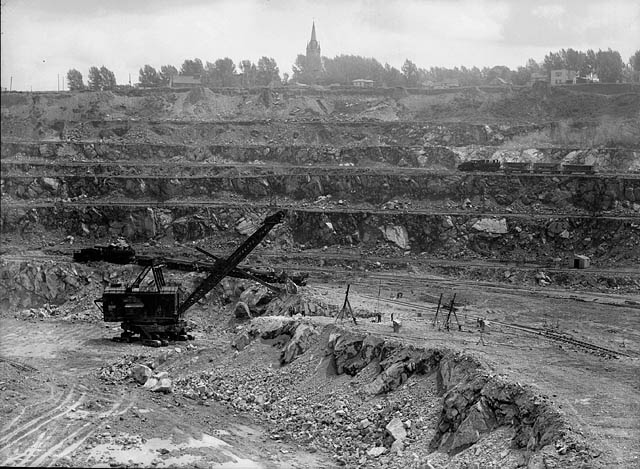
Canada's biggest power shovel loading an ore train with asbestos at the Jeffrey Mine, Johns-Manville Co., Asbestos, Quebec, June 1944

Industrial-scale mining began in the Thetford Hills, Quebec, from the 1870s. Sir William Edmond Logan was the first to notice the large deposits of chrysotile in the hills in his capacity as head of Geological Survey of Canada. Samples of the minerals from there were displayed in London and elicited much interest. With the opening of the Quebec Central Railway in 1876, mining entrepreneurs such as Andrew Stuart Johnson and William Henry Jeffrey established the asbestos industry in the province. The 50-ton output of the mines in 1878 rose to over 10,000 tonnes in the 1890s with the adoption of machine technologies and expanded production. For a long time, the world's largest asbestos mine was the Jeffrey Mine in the town of Asbestos, Quebec.

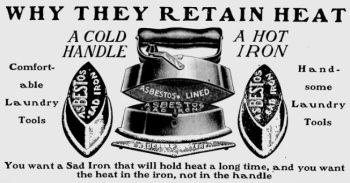
The applications of asbestos multiplied at the end of the 19th century—this is an advertisement for an asbestos-lined clothes iron from 1906

Asbestos production began in the Urals of the Russian Empire in the 1880s (notably the Bazhenovsky asbestos field), and the Alpine regions of Northern Italy with the formation in Turin of the Italo-English Pure Asbestos Company in 1876, although the greater production levels from the Canadian mines soon overtook European production. Mining also took off in South Africa from 1893 under the aegis of the British businessman Francis Oates, the director of the De Beers company. It was in South Africa that the production of amosite began in 1910. The US asbestos industry began in 1858 when fibrous anthophyllite was mined for use as asbestos insulation by the Johns Company, a predecessor to the current Johns Manville, at a quarry at Ward's Hill on Staten Island, New York. US production began in earnest in 1899 with the discovery of large deposits in Belvidere Mountain in Vermont.

The use of asbestos became increasingly widespread toward the end of the 19th century when its diverse applications included fire-retardant coatings, concrete, bricks, pipes, and fireplace cement, heat-, fire-, and acid-resistant gaskets, pipe insulation, ceiling insulation, fireproof drywall, flooring, roofing, lawn furniture, and drywall joint compound. In 2011, it was reported that over 50% of UK houses still contained asbestos, despite a ban on asbestos products some years earlier.

In Japan, particularly after World War II, asbestos was used in the manufacture of ammonium sulfate for purposes of rice production, sprayed upon the ceilings, iron skeletons, and walls of railroad cars and buildings (during the 1960s), and used for energy efficiency reasons as well. Asbestos production in Japan peaked in 1974 and fluctuated until about 1990, when production began to drop dramatically.

=== Discovery of toxicity ===
The 1898 Annual Report of the Chief Inspector of Factories and Workshops in the United Kingdom noted the negative health effects of asbestos, the contribution having been made by Lucy Deane Streatfeild, one of the first women factory inspectors.

In 1899, H. Montague Murray noted the negative health effects of asbestos. The first documented death related to asbestos was in 1906.

In the early 1900s, researchers began to notice a large number of early deaths and lung problems in asbestos-mining towns. The first such study was conducted by Murray at the Charing Cross Hospital, London, in 1900, in which a postmortem investigation discovered asbestos traces in the lungs of a young man who had died from pulmonary fibrosis after having worked for 14 years in an asbestos textile factory. Adelaide Anderson, the Inspector of Factories in Britain, included asbestos in a list of harmful industrial substances in 1902. Similar investigations were conducted in France in 1906 and Italy in 1908.

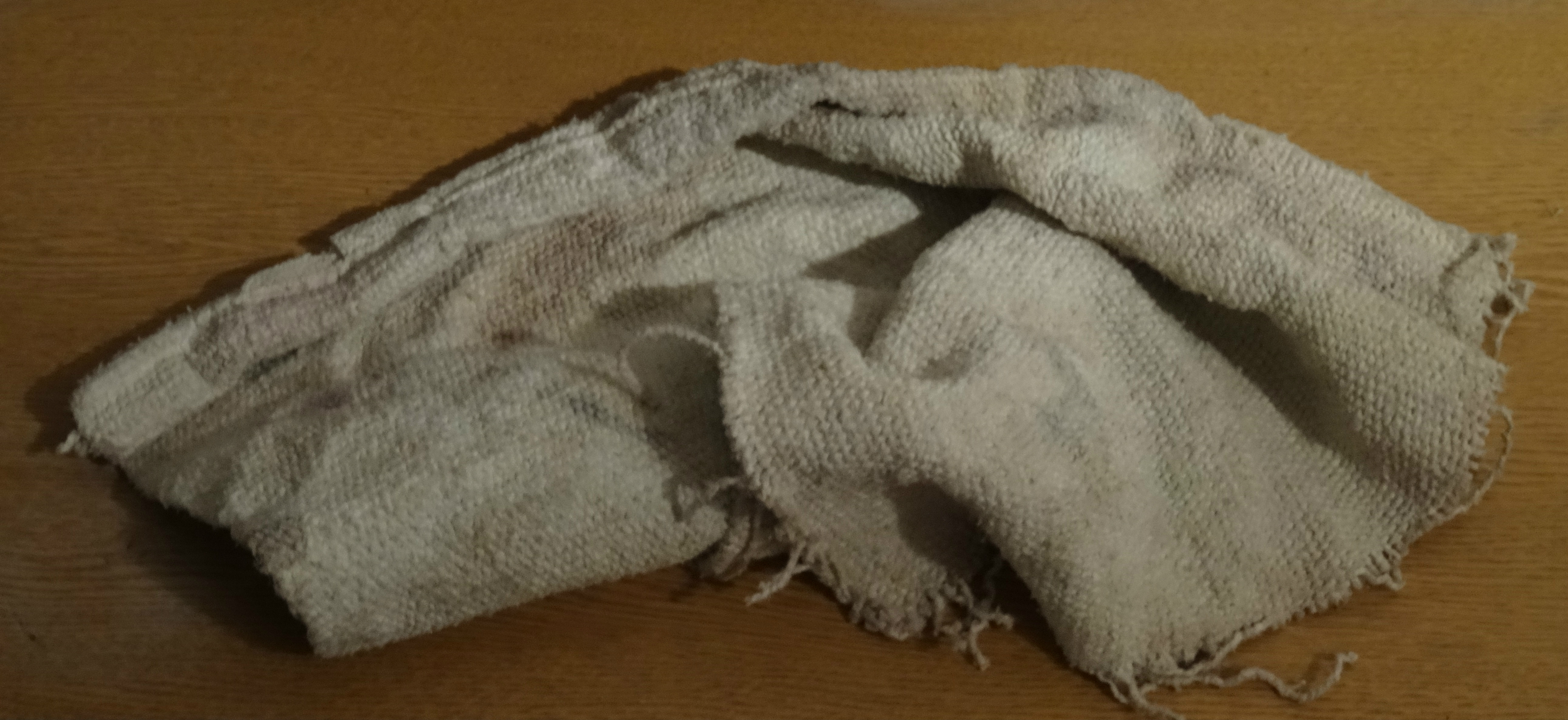
Asbestos fabric

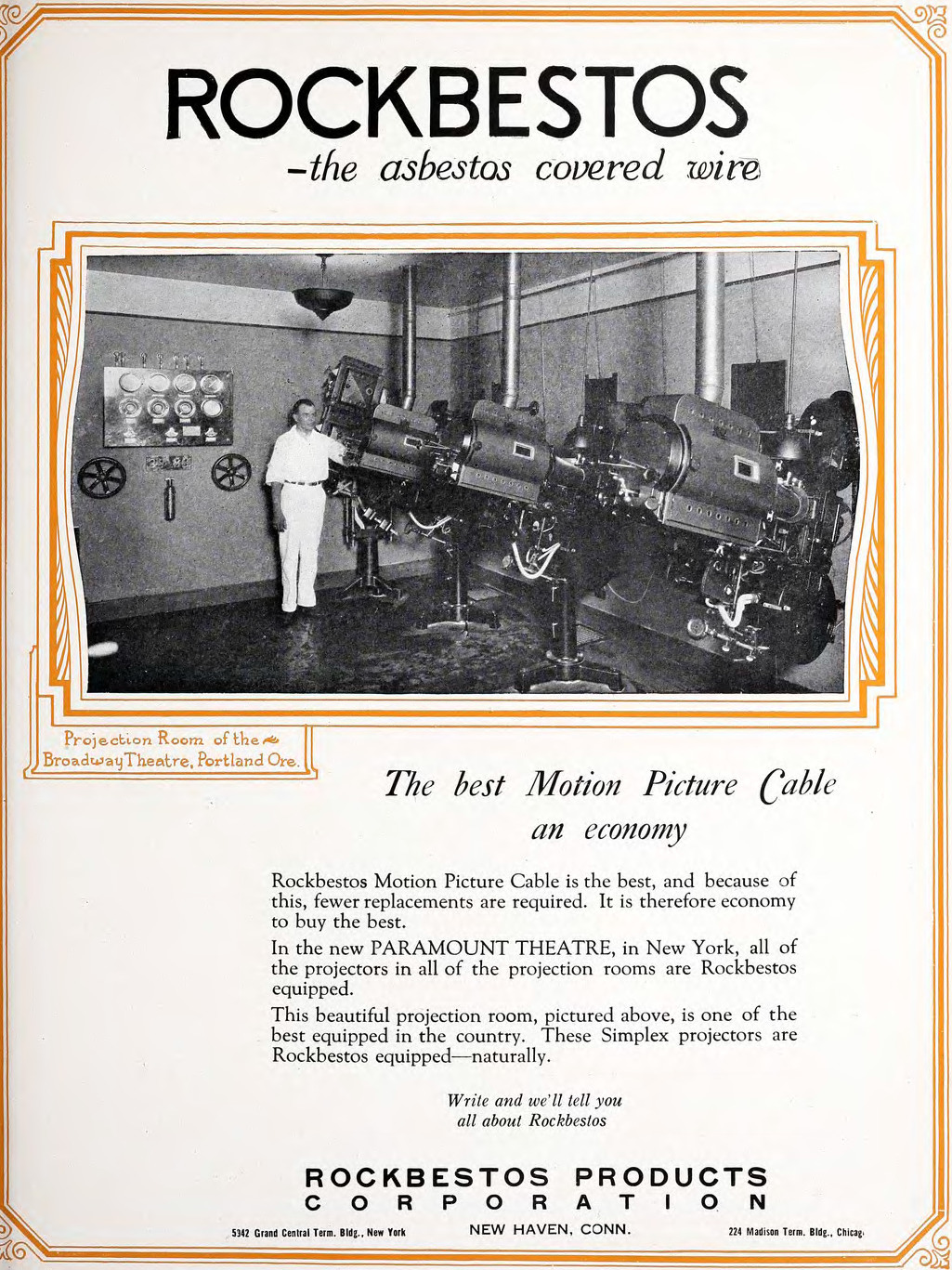
Rockbestos, asbestos covered wire advertisement in Exhibitors Herald, 1926

The first diagnosis of asbestosis was made in the UK in 1924. Nellie Kershaw was employed at Turner Brothers Asbestos in Rochdale, Greater Manchester, England, from 1917, spinning raw asbestos fibre into yarn. Her death in 1924 led to a formal inquest. Pathologist William Edmund Cooke testified that his examination of the lungs indicated old scarring indicative of a previous, healed tuberculosis infection, and extensive fibrosis, in which were visible "particles of mineral matter ... of various shapes, but the large majority have sharp angles." Having compared these particles with samples of asbestos dust provided by S. A. Henry, His Majesty's Medical Inspector of Factories, Cooke concluded that they "originated from asbestos and were, beyond a reasonable doubt, the primary cause of the fibrosis of the lungs and therefore of death."

As a result of Cooke's paper, Parliament commissioned an inquiry into the effects of asbestos dust by E. R. A. Merewether, Medical Inspector of Factories, and C. W. Price, a factory inspector and pioneer of dust monitoring and control. Their subsequent report, Occurrence of Pulmonary Fibrosis & Other Pulmonary Affections in Asbestos Workers, was presented to Parliament on 24 March 1930. It concluded that the development of asbestosis was irrefutably linked to the prolonged inhalation of asbestos dust, and included the first health study of asbestos workers, which found that 66% of those employed for 20 years or more suffered from asbestosis. The report led to the publication of the first asbestos industry regulations in 1931, which came into effect on 1 March 1932. These rules regulated ventilation and made asbestosis an excusable work-related disease. The term mesothelioma was first used in medical literature in 1931; its association with asbestos was first noted sometime in the 1940s. Similar legislation followed in the US about ten years later.

Epidemiological studies of shipyard workers have documented substantially elevated mortality from asbestos-related diseases, including mesothelioma, lung cancer, and asbestosis. In the Hampton Roads area, a shipbuilding center, mesothelioma occurrence is seven times the national rate. Thousands of tons of asbestos were used in World War II ships to insulate piping, boilers, steam engines, and steam turbines. There were approximately 4.3 million shipyard workers in the United States during the war; for every 1,000 workers, about 14 died of mesothelioma and an unknown number died of asbestosis.

The United States government and the asbestos industry have been criticized for not acting quickly enough to inform the public of dangers and to reduce public exposure. In the late 1970s, court documents established that asbestos industry officials knew asbestos was dangerous since the 1930s and had concealed this fact from the public.

In Australia, asbestos was widely used in construction and other industries between 1946 and 1980. From the 1970s, there was increasing concern about the dangers of asbestos, and following community and union campaigning, its use was phased out, with mining having ceased in 1983. The use of asbestos was phased out in 1989 and banned entirely in December 2003. The dangers of asbestos are now well known in Australia, and there is help and support for those suffering from asbestosis or mesothelioma.

== Use by industry and product type ==
The EPA defines six mineral types as "asbestos," including those in the serpentine and amphibole classes. All six asbestos mineral types are known to be human carcinogens. The visible fibers are themselves each composed of millions of microscopic "fibrils" that can be released by abrasion and other processes.

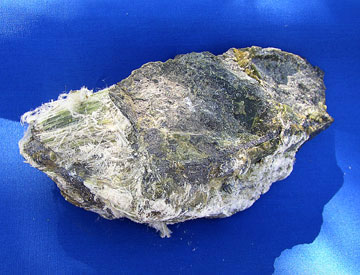
Chrysotile asbestos

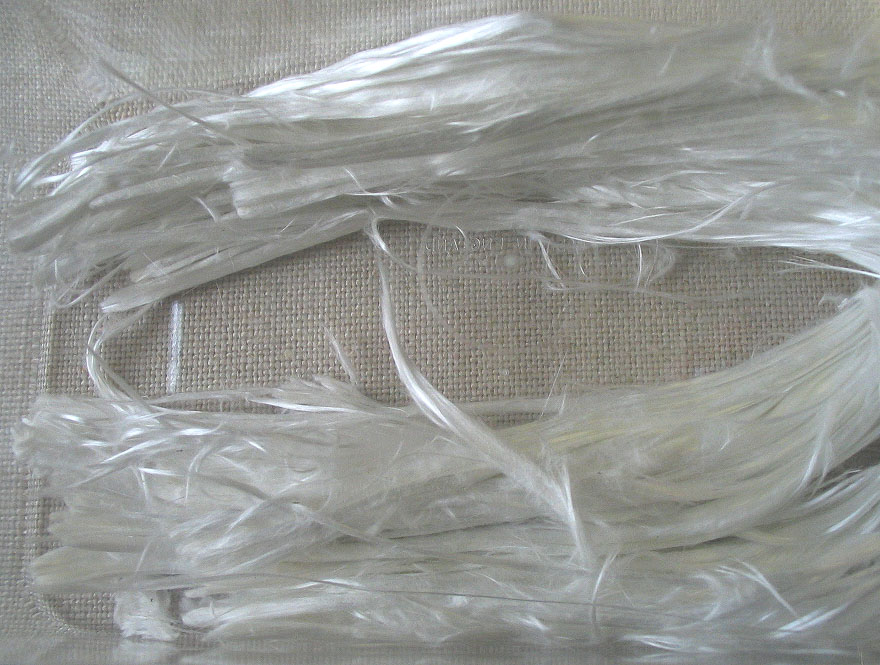
Asbestos fibers

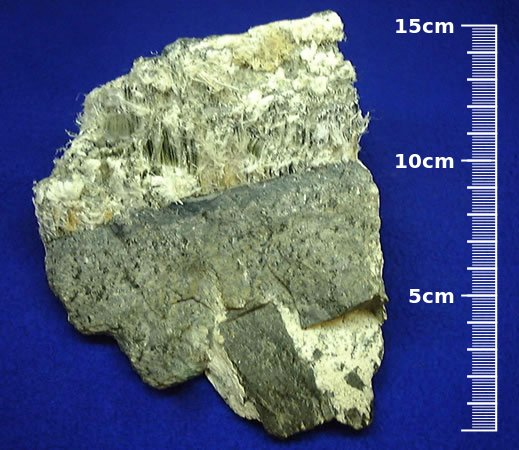
Asbestos

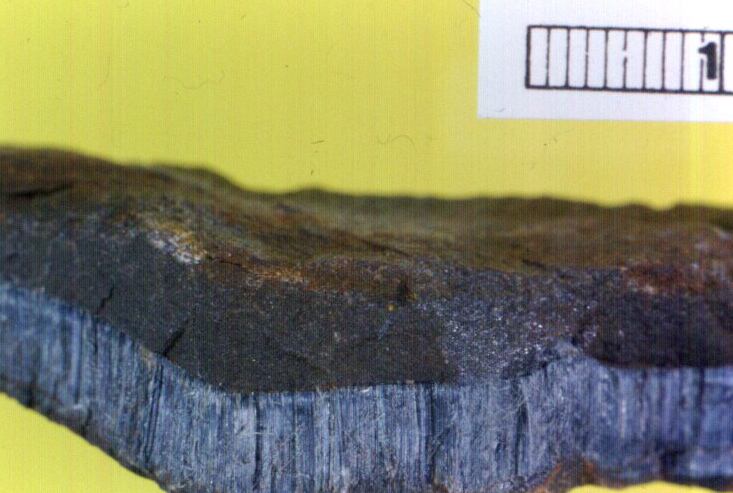
Blue asbestos (crocidolite); the ruler is 1 cm

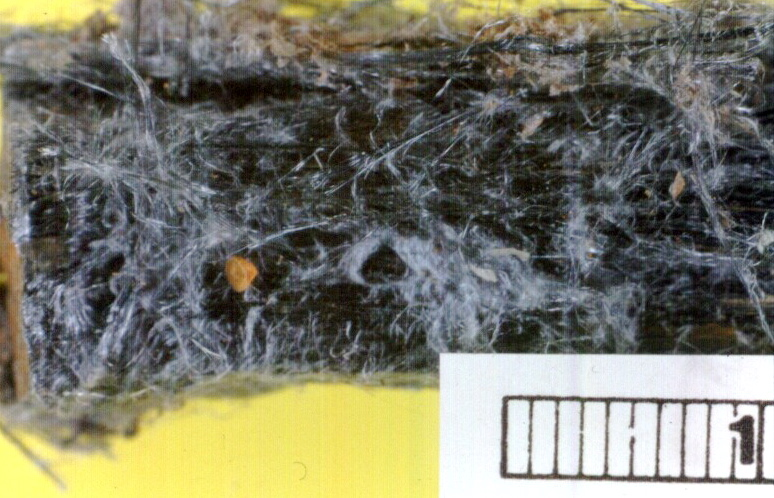
Blue asbestos, teased to show the fibrous nature of the mineral

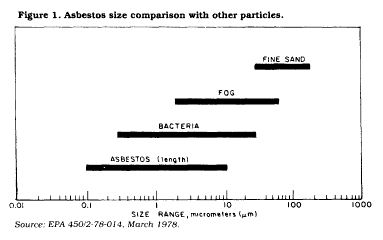
Size of asbestos fibers compared to other particles (USEPA, March 1978)

"Mountain leather" is an old-fashioned term for flexible, sheet-like natural formations of asbestiform minerals which resemble leather. Asbestos-containing minerals known to form mountain leather include actinolite, sepiolite, and tremolite.

Artificial Christmas snow, known as flocking, was previously made with asbestos. It was used as an effect in films including the scarecrows costume in The Wizard of Oz; there is a rumor that it was used as snow in the poppy field, but it was actually gypsum.

=== Serpentine group ===
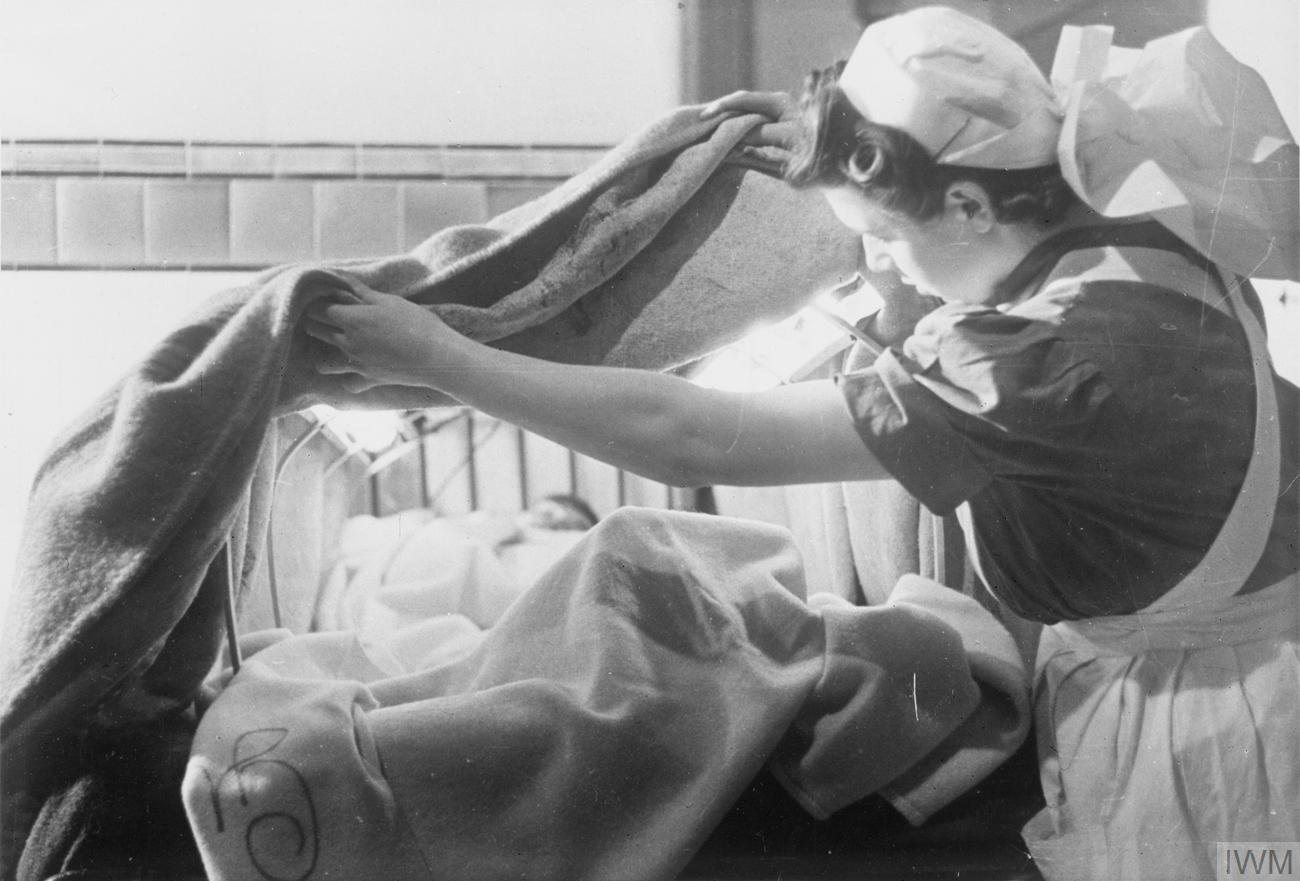
In Guy's Hospital, London, 1941, nurses arrange asbestos blankets over an electrically heated frame to create a hood over patients to help warm them quickly.

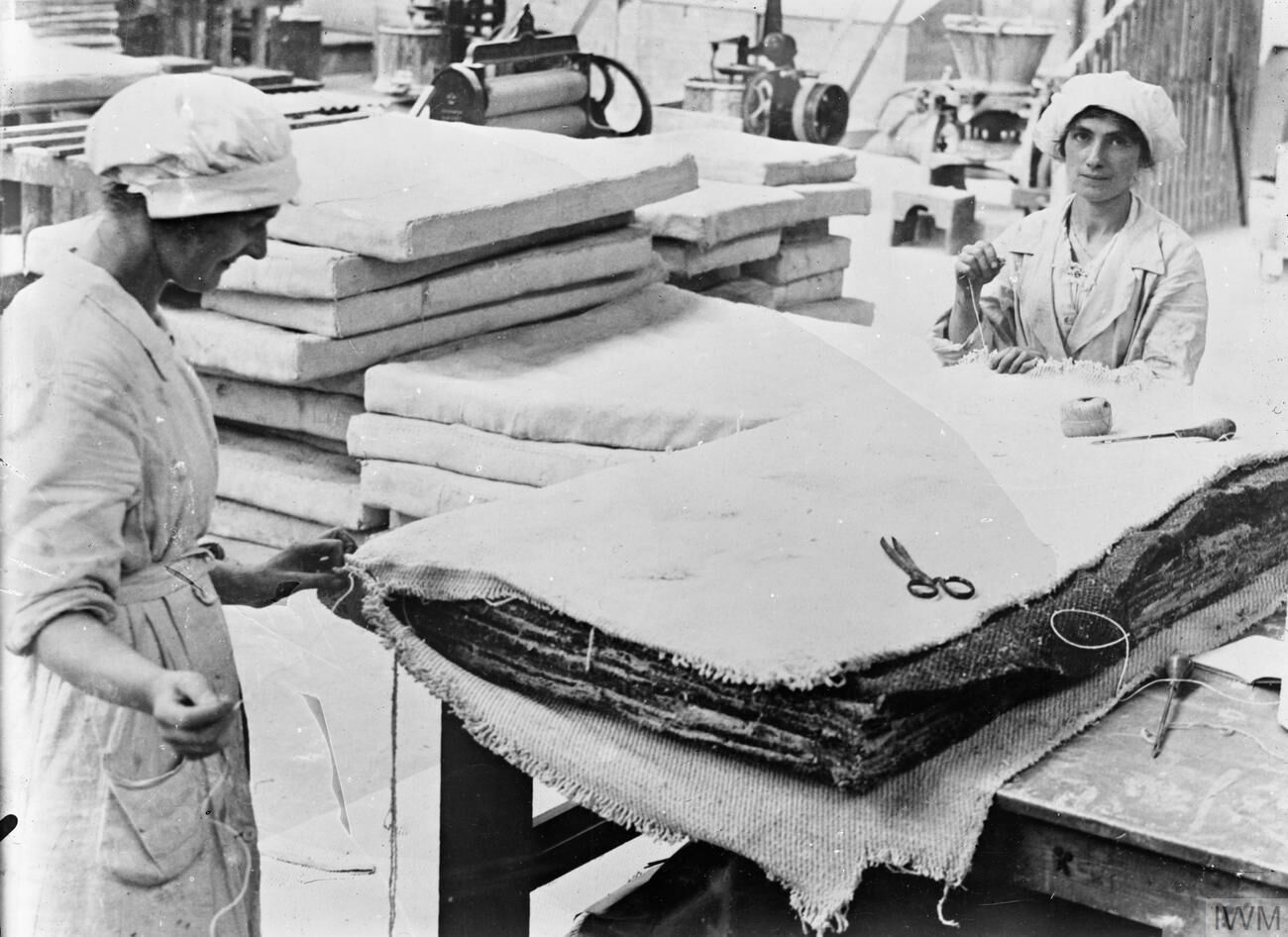
Workers sewing asbestos mattresses, used to line the boilers of navy vessels, in a Lancashire factory during the First World War

Serpentine minerals have a sheet or layered structure and produce curly fibers.

Chrysotile, CAS No. 12001-29-5 , is the only asbestos serpentine fiber. It is obtained from serpentinite rocks, which are common throughout the world. Its idealized chemical formula is Mg_{3}(Si_{2}O_{5})(OH)_{4}. Chrysotile appears under the microscope as a white fiber.

Chrysotile has been used more than any other type and was the type most commonly used in the United States. According to the US Environmental Protection Agency (EPA) Asbestos Building Inspectors Manual, chrysotile accounts for about 95% of the asbestos found in buildings in America.

Chrysotile is more flexible than amphibole asbestos and can be spun and woven into fabric. The most common use was corrugated asbestos cement roofing, primarily for outbuildings, warehouses, and garages. It may also be found in sheets or panels used for ceilings and sometimes for walls and floors. Chrysotile has been a component in joint compound and some plasters. Numerous other items have been made containing chrysotile, including brake linings, fire barriers in fuse boxes, pipe insulation, floor tiles, residential shingles, and gaskets for high-temperature equipment.

Chrysotile is often present in a wide variety of products and materials, including:

- Chlor Alkali diaphragm membranes used to make chlorine (currently in the US)
- Drywall and joint compound (including texture coats)
- Plaster
- Gas mask filters throughout World War II until the 1960s for most countries; Germany and the USSR's civilian-issued filters up until 1988 tested positive for asbestos
- Vinyl floor tiles, sheeting, adhesives
- Roofing tars, felts, siding, and shingles
- "Transite" panels, siding, countertops, and pipes
- Popcorn ceilings, also known as acoustic ceilings
- Fireproofing
- Caulk
- Industrial and marine gaskets
- Brake pads and shoes
- Stage curtains
- Fire blankets
- Cement pipework
- Interior fire doors
- Fireproof clothing for firefighters
- Thermal pipe insulation
- Filters for removing fine particulates from chemicals, liquids, and wine
- Dental cast linings
- HVAC flexible duct connectors
- Drilling fluid additives
- Finishing tool handles in bookbinding

In the European Union and Australia, it has been banned as a potential health hazard and is no longer used at all.

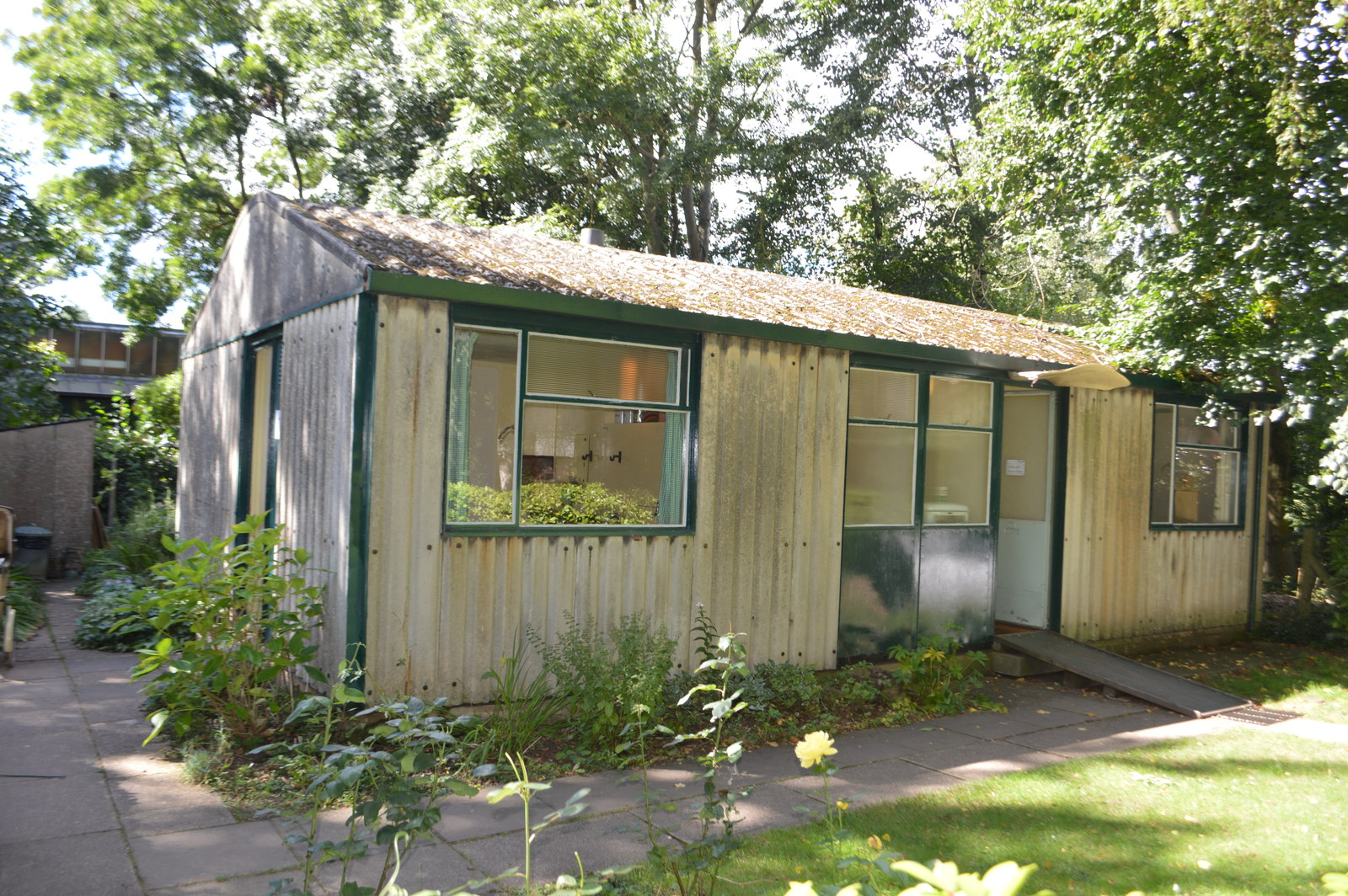
Example of asbestos cement siding and lining on a post-war temporary house at Avoncroft Museum of Historic Buildings. Nearly 40,000 of these structures were built between 1946 and 1949 to house families.

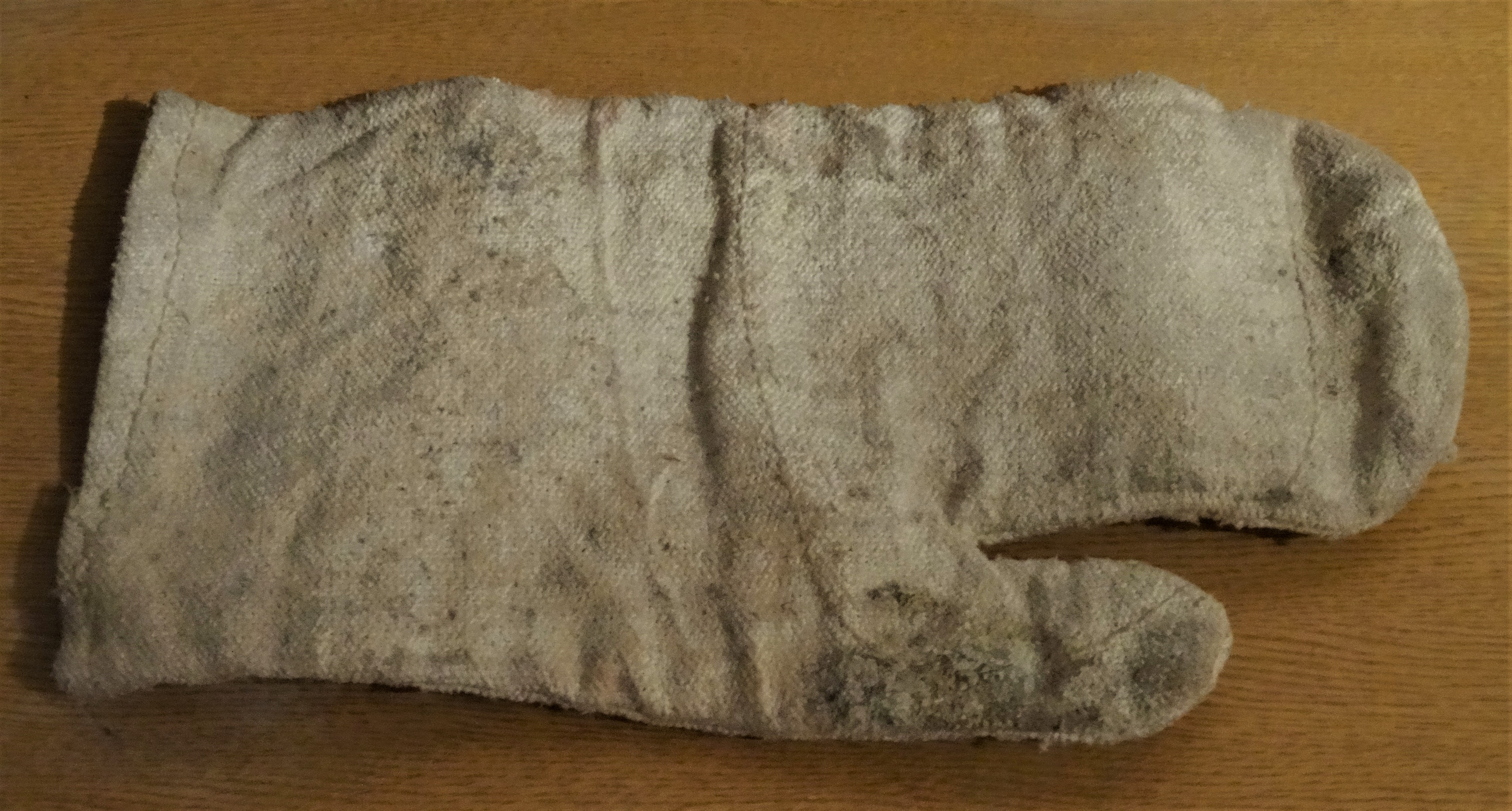
An asbestos glove

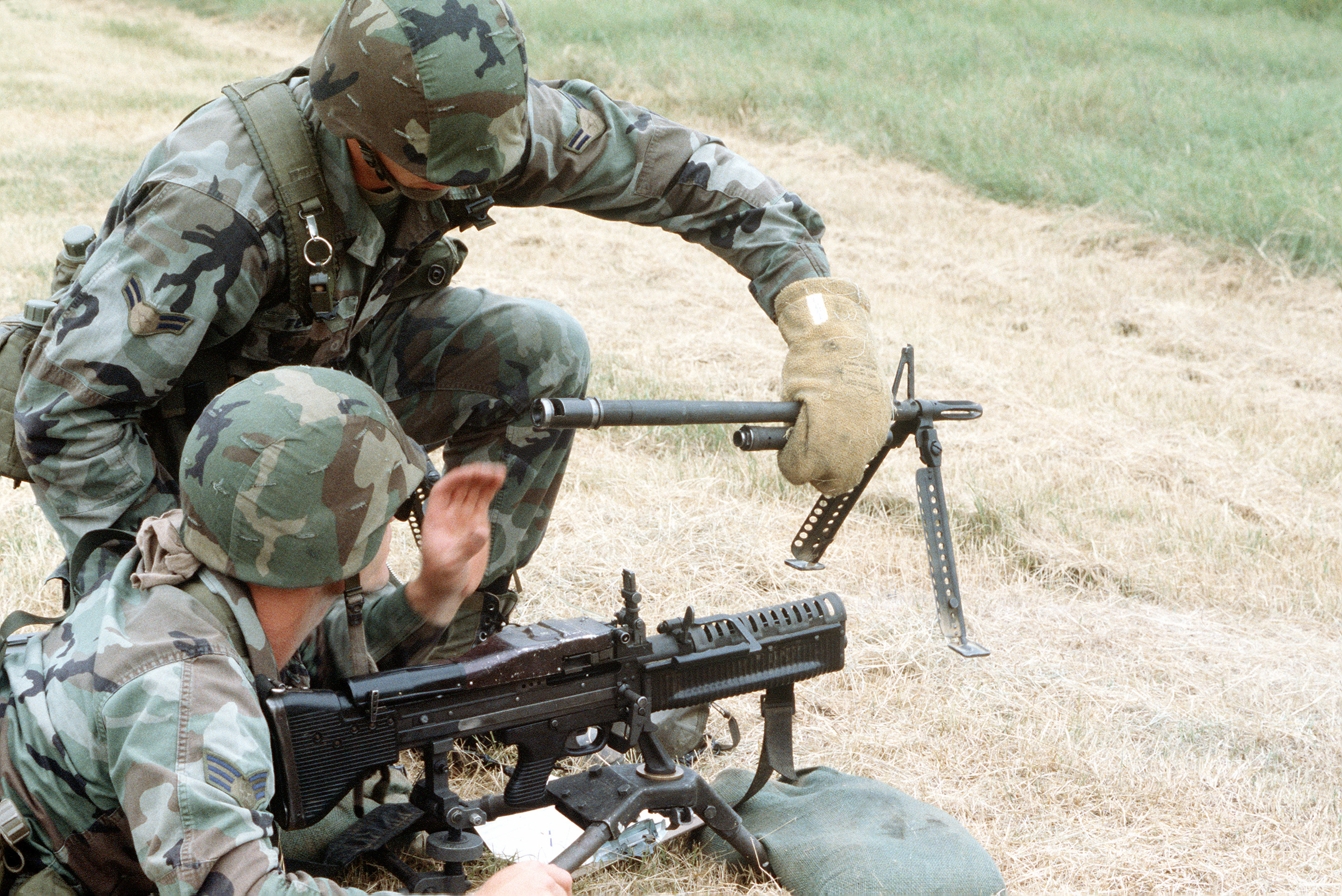
The M60 machine gun crew member responsible for a hot barrel change was issued protective asbestos gloves to prevent burns to the hands.

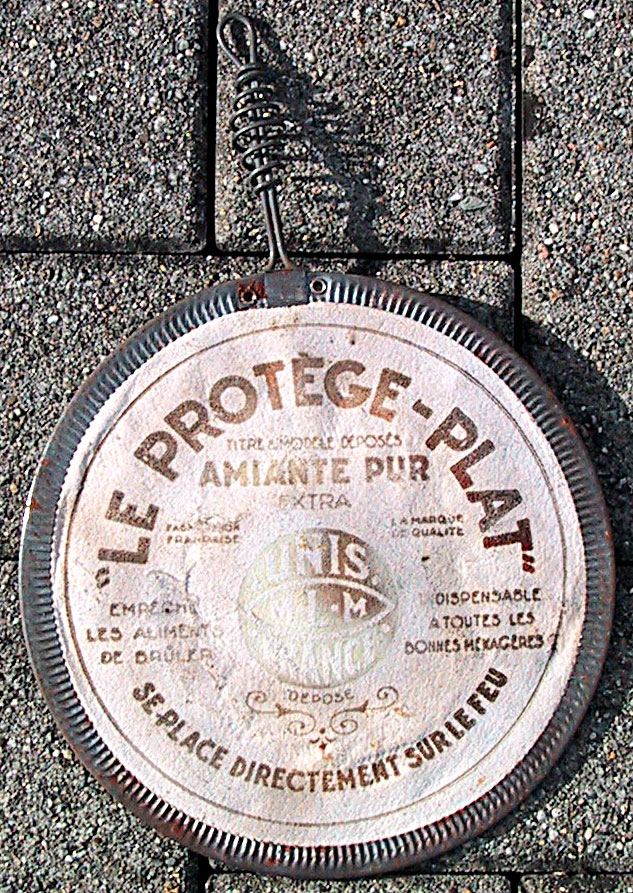
A household heat spreader for cooking on gas stoves, made of asbestos (probably 1950s; "amiante pur" is French for "pure asbestos")

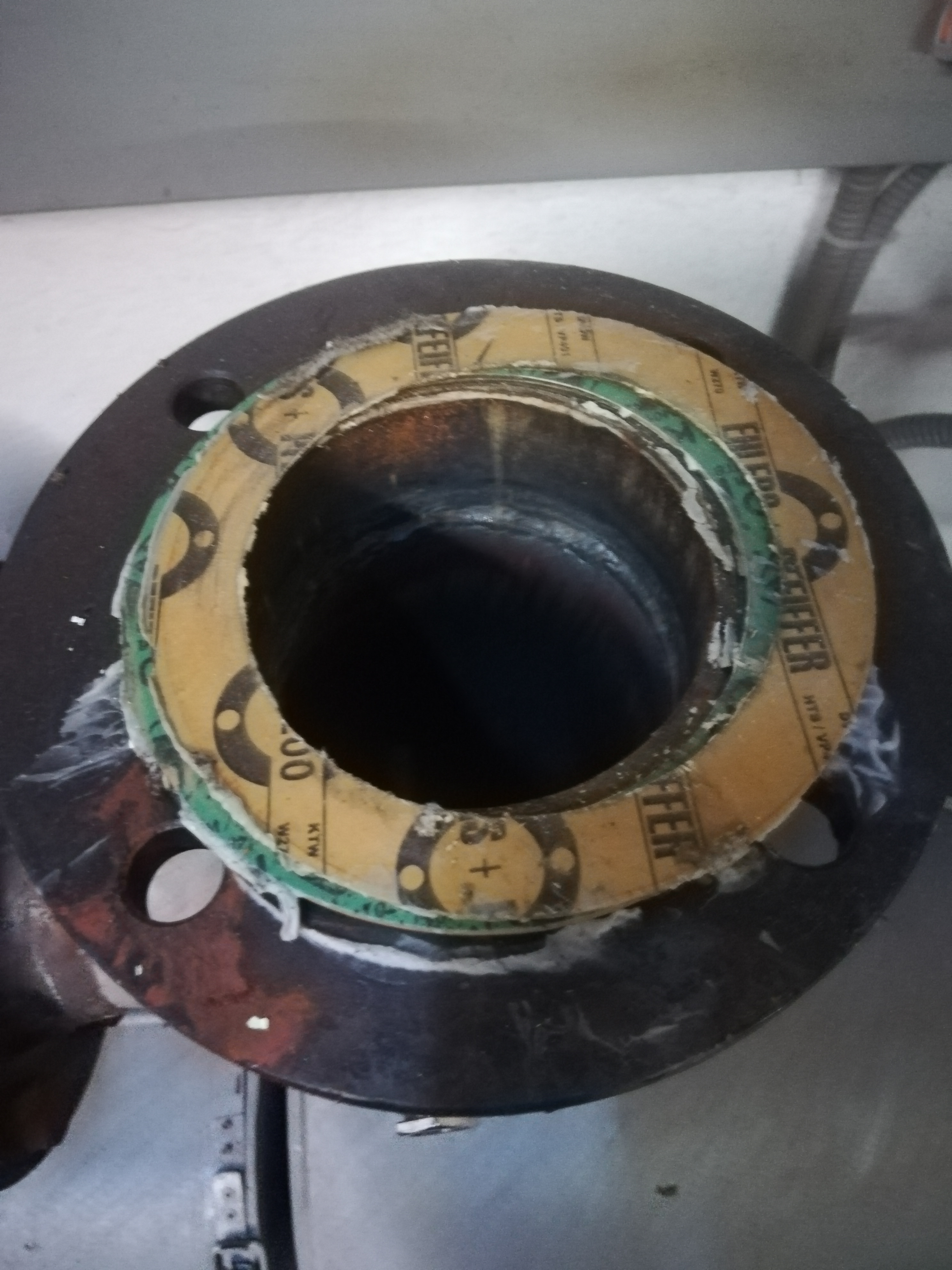
Gasket, containing nearly unbound asbestos

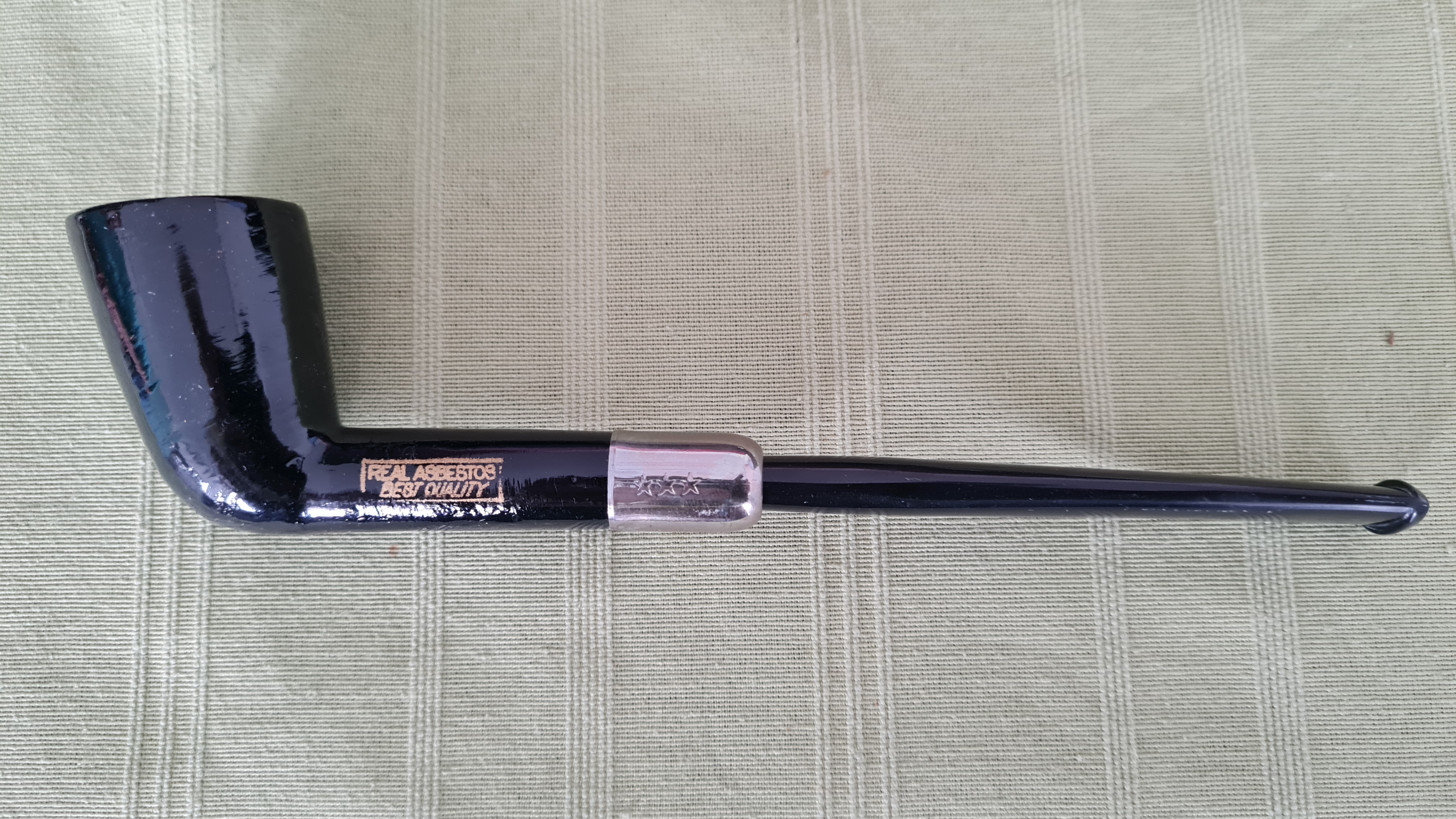
Asbestos pipe for tobacco smoking from Belgium, with inscription "Real asbestos best quality"

=== Amphibole group ===
Amphibole class fibers are needle-like. Amosite, crocidolite, tremolite, anthophyllite and actinolite are members of the amphibole class.

Amphiboles, including amosite (brown asbestos) and crocidolite (blue asbestos), were formerly used in many products until the early 1980s. Tremolite asbestos constituted a contaminant of many, if not all, naturally occurring chrysotile deposits. The use of all types of asbestos in the amphibole group was banned in much of the Western world by the mid-1980s, and in Japan by 1995. Some products that included amphibole types of asbestos included the following:

- Low-density insulating board (often referred to as AIB or asbestos insulating board) and ceiling tiles;
- Asbestos cement sheets and pipes for construction, casing for water and electrical/telecommunication services;
- Thermal and chemical insulation (e.g., fire-rated doors, limpet spray, lagging, and gaskets).
- Electrical wiring, braided cables, cable wrap, wire insulation (usually crocidolite)

Cigarette manufacturer Lorillard (Kent's filtered cigarette) used crocidolite asbestos in its "Micronite" cigarette filters from 1952 to 1956.

While mostly chrysotile asbestos fibers were once used in automobile brake pads, shoes, and clutch discs, amphibole contaminants were present. Since approximately the mid-1990s, brake pads, new or replacement, have been manufactured with linings made of ceramic, carbon, metallic, and aramid fiber (Twaron or Kevlar—the same material used in bulletproof vests).

==== Amosite ====
Amosite, CAS No. 12172-73-5 , often referred to as brown asbestos, is a trade name for the amphiboles belonging to the cummingtonite-grunerite solid solution series, commonly from South Africa, named as a partial acronym for "Asbestos Mines of South Africa". One formula given for amosite is Fe_{7}Si_{8}O_{22}(OH)_{2}. Amosite is seen under a microscope as a grey-white vitreous fiber. It is most frequently used as a fire retardant in thermal insulation products, asbestos insulating board and ceiling tiles.

==== Crocidolite ====
Crocidolite, CAS No. 12001-28-4 , commonly known as blue asbestos, is the fibrous form of the amphibole riebeckite, found primarily in southern Africa, but also in Australia and Bolivia. One formula given for crocidolite is Na_{2}Fe^{II}_{3}Fe^{III}_{2}Si_{8}O_{22}(OH)_{2}. Crocidolite is seen under a microscope as a blue fiber.

Crocidolite commonly occurs as soft friable fibers. Asbestiform amphibole may also occur as soft friable fibers, but some varieties, such as amosite, are commonly straighter. All forms of asbestos are fibrillar in that they are composed of fibers with breadths less than 1 micrometer in bundles of very great widths. Asbestos with particularly fine fibers is also referred to as "amianthus".

==== Tremolite, anthophyllite, actinolite ====
Other regulated asbestos minerals, such as tremolite asbestos, CAS No. 77536-68-6 , Ca_{2}Mg_{5}Si_{8}O_{22}(OH)_{2}; actinolite asbestos, CAS No. 77536-66-4, Ca_{2}(Mg,Fe^{II})_{5}(Si_{8}O_{22})(OH)_{2}; and anthophyllite asbestos, CAS No. 77536-67-5 , (Mg,Fe^{II})_{7}Si_{8}O_{22}(OH)_{2}; are less commonly used industrially but can still be found in a variety of construction materials and insulation materials and have been used in a few consumer products.

Other natural asbestiform minerals, such as richterite, Na(CaNa)(Mg,Fe^{II})_{5}(Si_{8}O_{22})(OH)_{2}, and winchite, (CaNa)Mg_{4}(Al,Fe^{III})(Si_{8}O_{22})(OH)_{2}, though not regulated, are said by some to be no less harmful than tremolite, amosite, or crocidolite. They are termed "asbestiform" rather than asbestos. Although the US Occupational Safety and Health Administration (OSHA) has not included them in the asbestos standard, NIOSH and the American Thoracic Society have recommended them for inclusion as regulated materials because they may also be hazardous to health.

=== Potential use in carbon sequestration ===
The potential for the use of asbestos to mitigate climate change has been raised. Although the adverse aspects of mining minerals, including health effects, must be taken into account, exploration of the use of mineral wastes to sequester carbon is being studied. The use of mining waste materials from nickel, copper, diamond, and platinum mines has the potential as well, but asbestos may have the greatest potential and is the subject of research now in progress in an emerging field of scientific study to examine it. The most common type of asbestos, chrysotile, chemically reacts with carbon dioxide to produce ecologically stable magnesium carbonate. Chrysotile, like all types of asbestos, has a large surface area that provides more places for chemical reactions to occur, compared to most other naturally occurring materials.

=== Construction ===
==== Developed countries ====
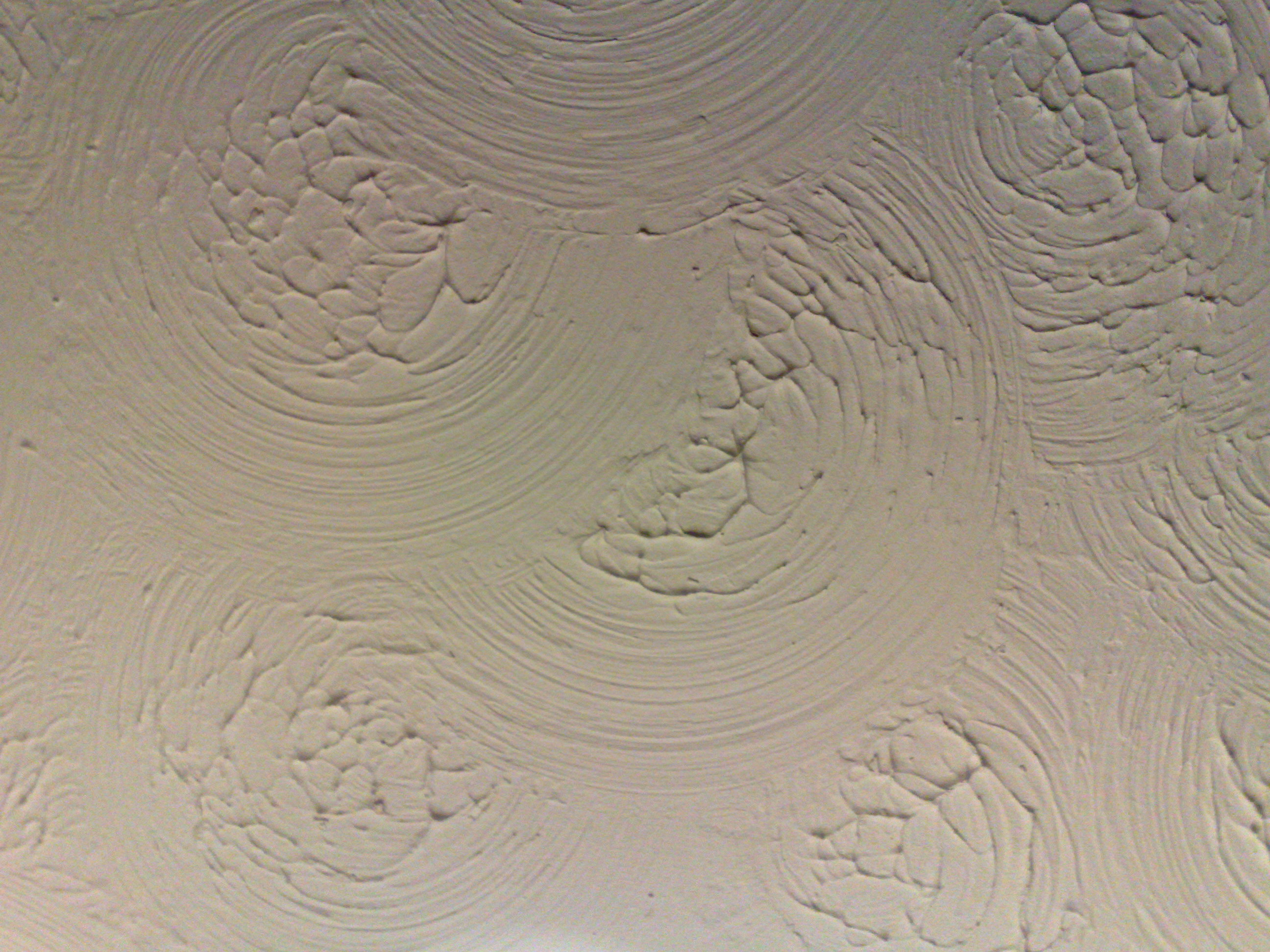
Older decorative ceilings, similar to this one, may contain small amounts of white asbestos.

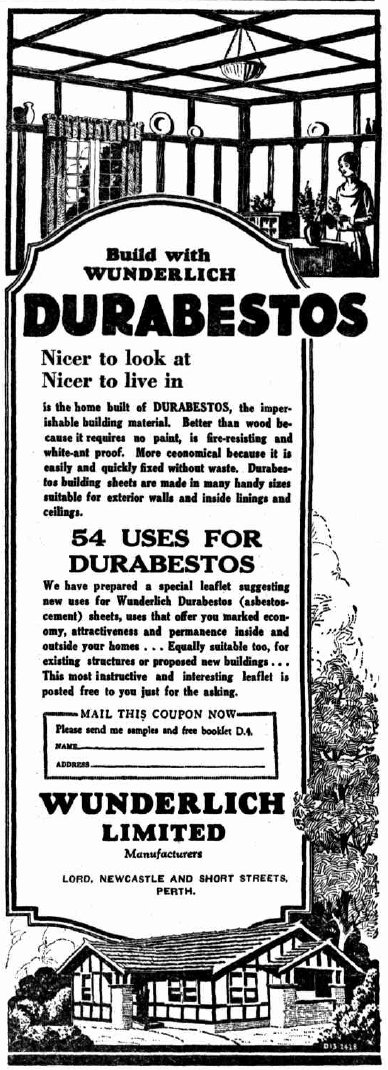
1929 newspaper advertisement from Perth, Western Australia, for asbestos sheeting for residential building construction

Asbestos as slab as roof material

The use of asbestos in construction projects has been banned for health and safety reasons in many developed countries or regions, including the European Union, the United Kingdom, Australia, Hong Kong, Japan, and New Zealand. The 5th Circuit Court prevented the EPA from banning asbestos in 1991 because EPA research showed the ban would cost between US$450 and 800 million while only saving around 200 lives in a 13-year timeframe, and that the EPA did not provide adequate evidence for the safety of alternative products. Until the mid-1980s, small amounts of white asbestos were used in the manufacture of Artex, a decorative stipple finish, however, some of the lesser-known suppliers of Artex-type materials were still adding white asbestos until 1999.

Before the ban, asbestos was widely used in the construction industry in thousands of materials. Some are judged to be more dangerous than others due to the amount of asbestos and the material's friable nature. Loose fill asbestos, sprayed coatings, pipe insulation, and Asbestos Insulating Board (AIB) are thought to be the most dangerous due to their high content of asbestos and friable nature. Many older buildings built before the late 1990s contain asbestos. In the United States, there is a minimum standard for asbestos surveys as described by ASTM standard E 2356–18. In the UK, the Health and Safety Executive have issued guidance called HSG264 describing how surveys should be completed although other methods can be used if they can demonstrate they have met the regulations by other means. The EPA includes some, but not all, asbestos-contaminated facilities on the Superfund National Priorities List (NPL). Renovation and demolition of asbestos-contaminated buildings are subject to EPA NESHAP and OSHA Regulations. Asbestos is not a material covered under CERCLA's innocent purchaser defense. In the UK, the removal and disposal of asbestos and substances containing it are covered by the Control of Asbestos Regulations 2006.

US asbestos consumption hit a peak of 804,000 tons in 1973; world asbestos demand peaked around 1977, with 25 countries producing nearly 4.8 million metric tons annually.

In older buildings (e.g., those built before 1999 in the UK, before white asbestos was banned), asbestos may still be present in some areas. Being aware of asbestos locations reduces the risk of disturbing asbestos.

Removal of asbestos building components can also remove the fire protection they provide; therefore, fire protection substitutes are required for the proper fire protection that the asbestos originally provided.

==== Outside the European Union and North America ====
Some countries, such as India, Indonesia, China, and Russia, have continued widespread use of asbestos. The most common is corrugated asbestos-cement sheets or "A/C sheets" for roofing and sidewalls. Millions of homes, factories, schools, or sheds, and shelters continue to use asbestos. Cutting these sheets to size and drilling holes to receive 'J' bolts to help secure the sheets to roof framing is done on-site. There has been no significant change in production and use of A/C sheets in developing countries following the widespread restrictions in developed nations.

==== September 11 attacks ====
As New York City's World Trade Center collapsed following the September 11 attacks, Lower Manhattan was blanketed in a mixture of building debris and combustible materials. This complex mixture gave rise to the concern that thousands of residents and workers in the area would be exposed to known hazards in the air and dust, such as asbestos, lead, glass fibers, and pulverized concrete. More than 1,000 tons of asbestos are thought to have been released into the air following the buildings' destruction. Monitoring at and near Ground Zero immediately after the attacks indicated that the dust contained fibers, including various forms of asbestos. Inhalation of a mixture of asbestos and other toxicants is thought to be linked to the unusually high death rate from cancer of emergency service workers since the disaster. Thousands more are now thought to be at risk of developing cancer due to this exposure, with those who have died so far being only the "tip of the iceberg".

In May 2002, after numerous cleanup, dust collection, and air monitoring activities were conducted outdoors by the EPA, other federal agencies, New York City, and the state of New York, New York City formally requested federal assistance to clean and test residences in the vicinity of the World Trade Center site for airborne asbestos.

=== Asbestos contaminants in other products ===
==== Vermiculite ====
Vermiculite is a hydrated laminar magnesium-aluminum-iron silicate that resembles mica. It can be used for many industrial applications and has been used as insulation. Some deposits of vermiculite are contaminated with small amounts of asbestos.

One vermiculite mine operated by W. R. Grace and Company in Libby, Montana exposed workers and community residents to danger by mining vermiculite contaminated with asbestos, typically richterite, winchite, actinolite or tremolite. Vermiculite contaminated with asbestos from the Libby mine was used as insulation in residential and commercial buildings through Canada and the United States. W. R. Grace and Company's loose-fill vermiculite was marketed as Zonolite but was also used in sprayed-on products such as Monokote.

In 1999, the EPA began cleanup efforts in Libby, and now the area is a Superfund cleanup area. The EPA has determined that harmful asbestos is released from the mine as well as through other activities that disturb soil in the area.

==== Talc ====
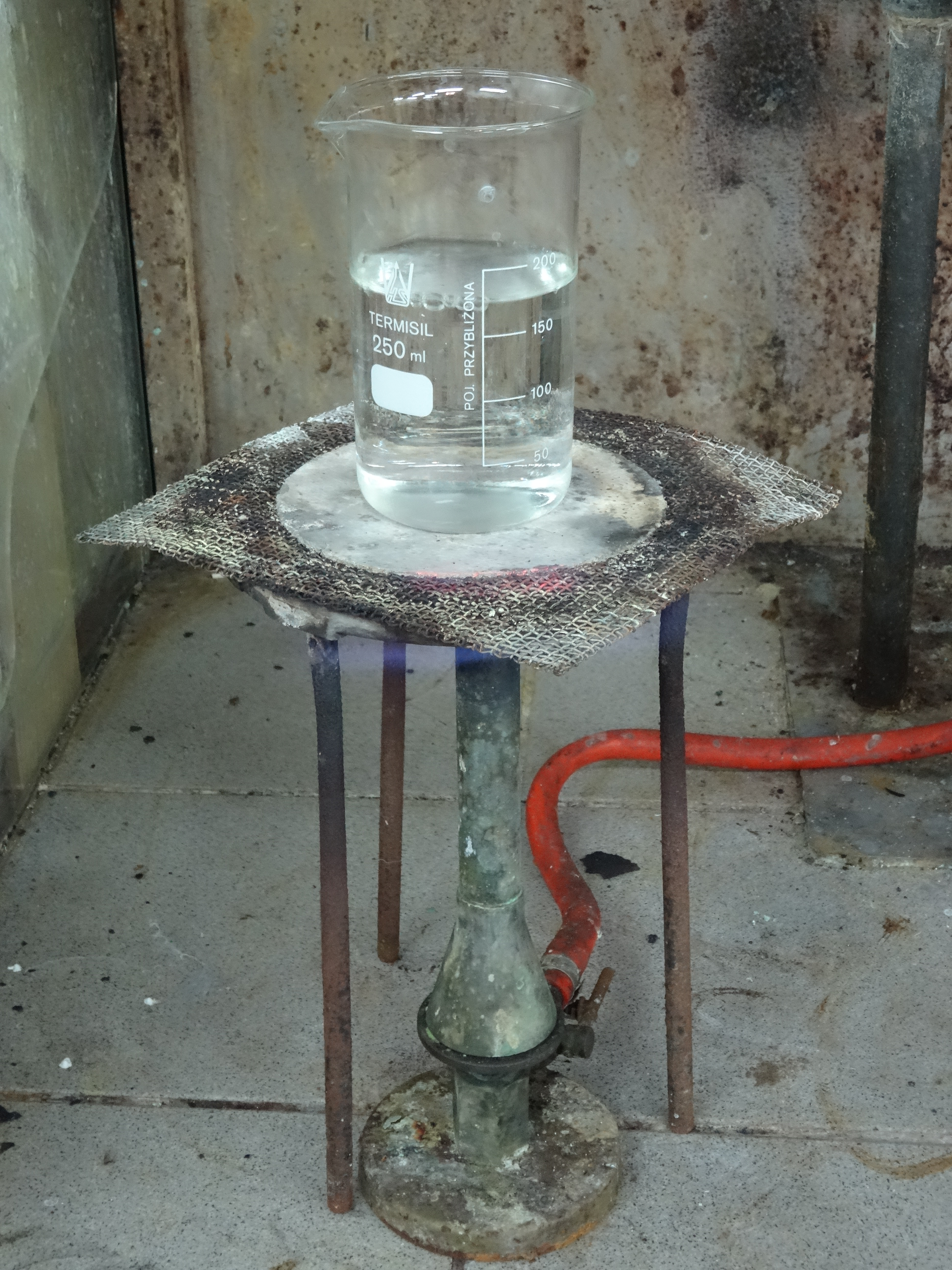
A laboratory wire gauze made of asbestos, on a tripod over a Teclu burner

Talc can sometimes be contaminated with asbestos due to the proximity of asbestos ore (usually tremolite) in underground talc deposits. By 1973, US federal law required all talc products to be asbestos-free. Separating cosmetic-grade talc (e.g. talcum powder) from industrial-grade talc (often used in friction products) has largely eliminated this issue for consumers. Cosmetics companies, including Johnson & Johnson, have known since the 1950s that talc products could be contaminated with asbestos. In July 2024, the World Health Organization (WHO) heightened its health warning about talc exposure. In a study published in The Lancet, the WHO changed its classification of talc from "possibly carcinogenic" to "probably carcinogenic."

In 2000, tests in a certified asbestos-testing laboratory found the tremolite form of amphibole asbestos used to be found in three out of eight popular brands of children's crayons that were made partly from talc: Crayola, Prang, and RoseArt. In Crayola crayons, the tests found asbestos levels around 0.05% in Carnation Pink and 2.86% in Orchid; in Prang crayons, the range was from 0.3% in Periwinkle to 0.54% in Yellow; in Rose Art crayons, it was from 0.03% in Brown to 1.20% in Orange. Overall, 32 different types of crayons from these brands used to contain more than trace amounts of asbestos, and eight others contained trace amounts. The Art and Creative Materials Institute, a trade association which tested the safety of crayons on behalf of the makers, initially insisted the test results must have been incorrect, although they later said they do not test for asbestos. In May 2000, Crayola said tests by Richard Lee, a materials analyst whose testimony on behalf of the asbestos industry has been accepted in lawsuits over 250 times, found its crayons tested negative for asbestos. Despite that, in June 2000 Binney & Smith, the maker of Crayola, and the other makers agreed to stop using talc in their products, and changed their product formulations in the United States.

The mining company R T Vanderbilt Co of Gouverneur, New York, which supplied the talc to the crayon makers, states that "to the best of our knowledge and belief" there had never been any asbestos-related disease among the company's workers. However media reports claim that the United States Mine Safety and Health Administration (MSHA) had found asbestos in four talc samples tested in 2000. The Assistant Secretary for Mine Safety and Health subsequently wrote to the news reporter, stating that "In fact, the abbreviation ND (non-detect) in the laboratory report – indicates no asbestos fibers actually were found in the samples." Multiple studies by mineral chemists, cell biologists, and toxicologists between 1970 and 2000 found neither samples of asbestos in talc products nor symptoms of asbestos exposure among workers dealing with talc, but more recent work has rejected these conclusions in favor of "same as" asbestos risk.

On 12 July 2018, a Missouri jury ordered Johnson & Johnson to pay a record $4.69 billion to 22 women who alleged the company's talc-based products, including its baby powder, contain asbestos and caused them to develop ovarian cancer.

== Production ==
Asbestos production

In 2017, 1.3 million tonnes of asbestos were mined worldwide. Russia was the largest producer with 53% of the world total (the largest proven reserves of Chrysotile or "white asbestos" located in the Bazhenovsky asbestos field), followed by Kazakhstan (16%), China (15%), and Brazil (11.5%). Asia consumes some 70% of the asbestos produced in the world with China, India and Indonesia being the largest consumers.

In 2009, about 9% of the world's asbestos production was in Canada. In late 2011, Canada's remaining two asbestos mines, both located in Quebec, halted operations. In September 2012, the Quebec government halted asbestos mining.

== Health impact ==
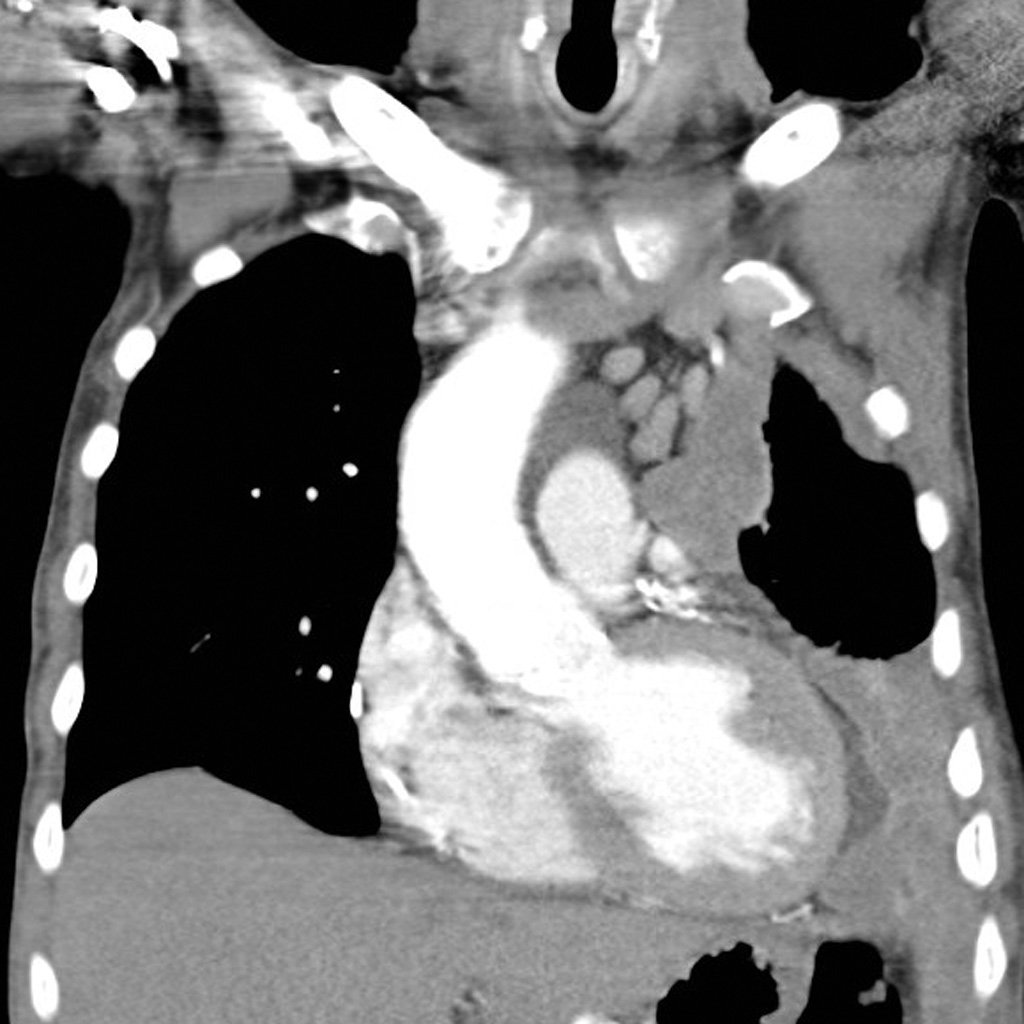
Left-sided mesothelioma (seen on the right of the image): chest CT

The most common diseases associated with chronic asbestos exposure are asbestosis (scarring of the lungs due to asbestos inhalation) and mesothelioma (cancer associated with asbestos). Mesothelioma is an aggressive form of cancer and often leads to a life expectancy of less than 12 months after diagnosis.

All types of asbestos fibers are known to represent serious health hazards in humans and animals. Amosite and crocidolite are considered the most hazardous asbestos fiber types; however, chrysotile asbestos has also produced tumors in animals and is a recognized cause of asbestosis and malignant mesothelioma in humans, and mesothelioma has been observed in people who were occupationally exposed to chrysotile, family members of the occupationally exposed, and residents who lived close to asbestos factories and mines.

During the 1980s and again in the 1990s, the asbestos industry suggested at times that the process of making asbestos cement could "neutralize" the asbestos, either via chemical processes or by causing the cement to attach to the fibers and changing their physical size; subsequent studies showed that this was untrue and that decades-old asbestos cement, when broken, releases asbestos fibers identical to those found in nature, with no detectable alteration.

Exposure to asbestos in the form of fibers is always considered dangerous. Working with, or exposure to, material that is friable, or materials or works that could cause the release of loose asbestos fibers, is considered high risk. In general, people who become ill from inhaling asbestos have been regularly exposed in a job where they worked directly with the material.

The US Occupational Safety and Health Administration (OSHA) has standards to protect workers from the hazards of exposure to asbestos in the workplace. The permissible exposure limit for asbestos is 0.1 fiber per cubic centimeter of air as an eight-hour time-weighted average, with an excursion limit of 1.0 asbestos fibers per cubic centimeter over 30 minutes.

== Regulation ==
=== Complete bans on asbestos ===
Map of countries that have banned the use of asbestos

Asbestos warning label under EU directive of 1983

Worldwide, 66 countries and territories (including all those in the European Union) have banned the use of asbestos. Exemptions for minor uses are permitted in some countries listed; however, all countries listed must have banned the use of all types of asbestos.

Country	Ban Date
Algeria	
Argentina	
Australia	31 December 2003
Austria	
Bahrain	
Belgium	1998
Brazil	2017
Brunei	
Bulgaria	
Canada	31 December 2018
Chile	
Colombia	1 January 2021
Croatia	
Cyprus	
Czech Republic	1995
Denmark	
Djibouti	
Egypt	
Estonia	
Finland	1 January 1994
France	
Gabon	
Germany	
Gibraltar	
Greece	
Honduras	
Hong Kong	2014
Hungary	2005
Iceland	1983
Iraq	
Iran	23 July 2000
Ireland	
Israel	
Italy	1992
Japan	March 2012
Jordan	
South Korea	January 2009
Kuwait	
Latvia	
Liechtenstein	
Lithuania	
Luxembourg	
Malta	
Mauritius	
Monaco	
Mozambique	
Netherlands	
New Caledonia	
New Zealand	2015
North Macedonia	
Norway	1985
Oman	
Poland	1997
Portugal	
Qatar	
Romania	
Saudi Arabia	1998
Serbia	
Seychelles	
Slovakia	
Slovenia	
South Africa	
Spain	
Sweden	1982
Switzerland	
Taiwan	
Turkey	
Ukraine	6 September 2022
United Kingdom	1999
Uruguay	

==== Australia ====
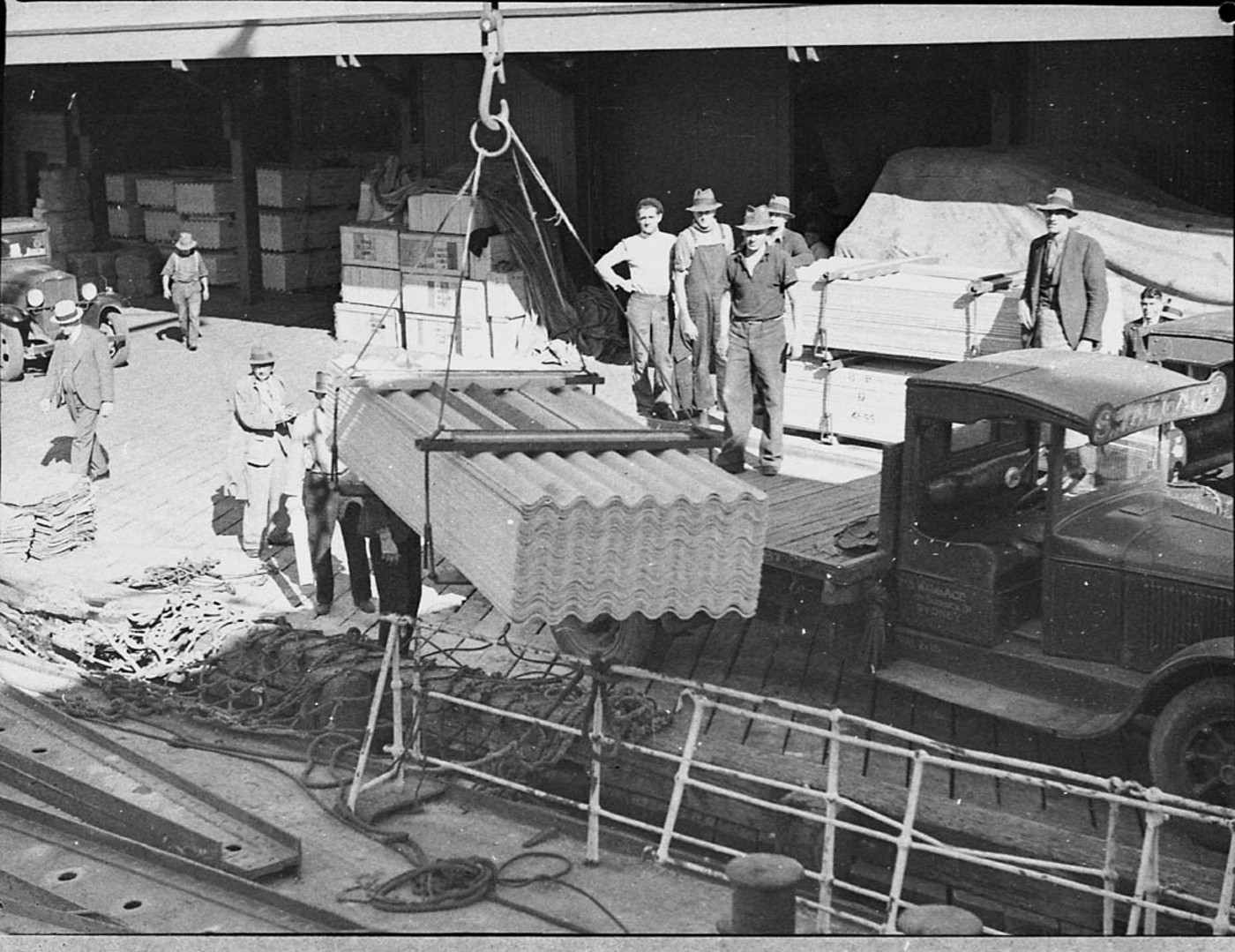
Asbestos Products Ltd (Sydney) asbestos cement corrugated roofing for export

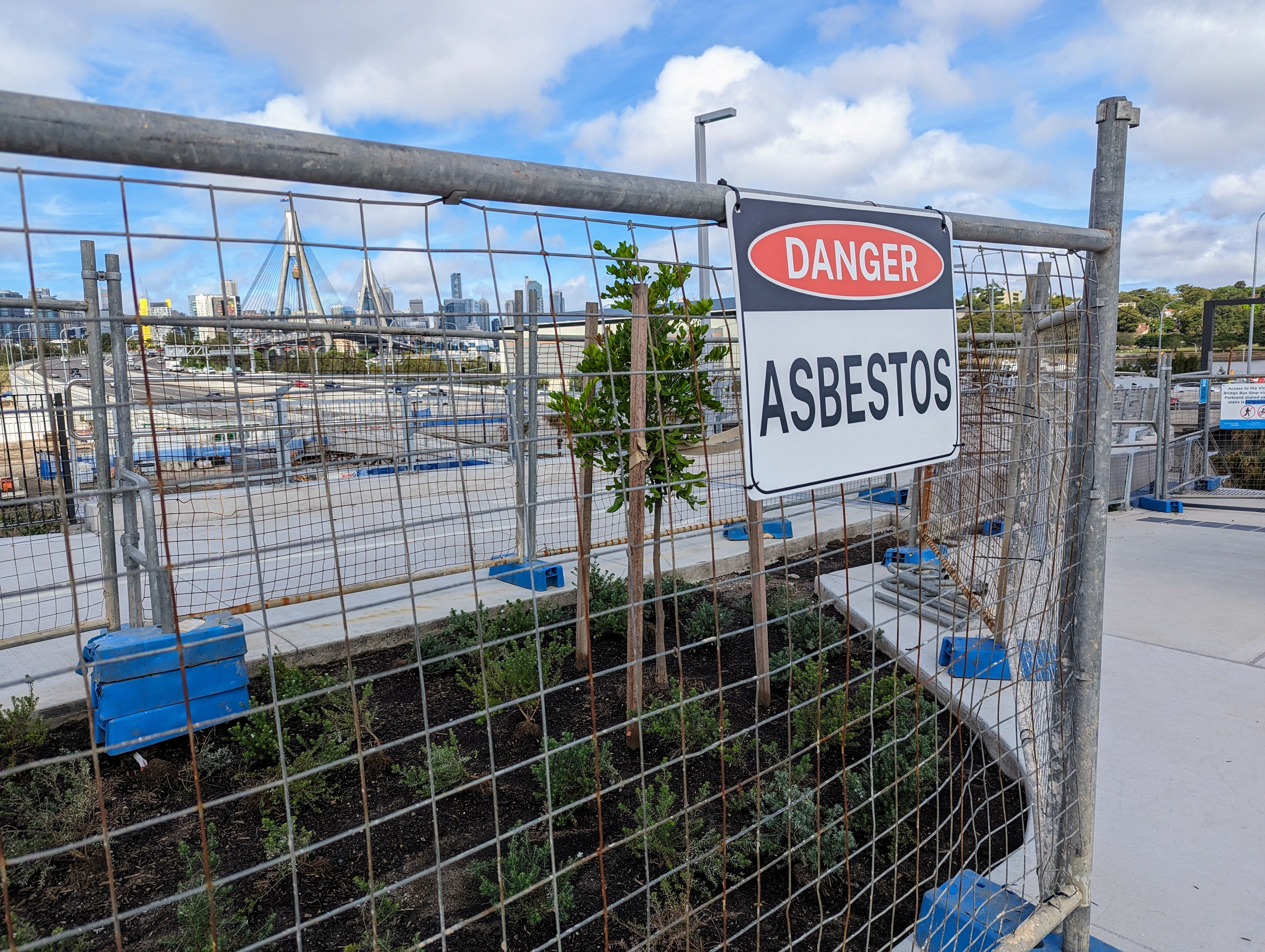
Asbestos-contaminated mulch in Sydney

The use of crocidolite (blue asbestos) was banned in 1967, while the use of amosite (brown asbestos) continued in the construction industry until the mid-1980s. It was finally banned from building products in 1989, prohibited for other uses in December 2003, and cannot be imported, used, or recycled.

Asbestos continues to be a problem in Australia. Two out of three homes in Australia built between World War II and the early 1980s still contain asbestos.

The United Services Union, representing workers tasked with modifying electrical meter boxes at residences, stated that workers should refuse to do this work until the boxes have been inspected for asbestos, and the head of the Australian Council of Trade Unions (ACTU) has called on the government to protect its citizens by ridding the country of asbestos by 2030.

Handlers of asbestos materials must have a B-Class license for bonded asbestos and an A-Class license for friable asbestos.

The town of Wittenoom, in Western Australia, was built around a (blue) asbestos mine. The entire town continues to be contaminated and has been disincorporated, allowing local authorities to remove references to Wittenoom from maps and road signs.

In January 2024, asbestos was found in garden mulch supplied to dozens of sites including parks, playgrounds and schools across Sydney, triggering the Sydney asbestos mulch crisis.

==== Canada ====
As of 31 December 2018, it is illegal to import, manufacture, sell, trade, or use products made from asbestos. There are exemptions for its use in the chloralkali industry, the military, nuclear facilities, and for magnesium extraction from asbestos mining residues.

==== Iran ====
On 23 July 2000, the Supreme Council of Environmental Protection of Iran banned any use of asbestos. In a note, the Council states that, after 44 years, if there is no replacement that is technically, economically, or financially suitable, the law is appealable and will be subject to review.

On 22 November 2011, Iran's Environmental Protection Organization banned the use of asbestos completely. It also banned all imports and exports of asbestos. On 9 October 2011, the Supreme Council of Environmental Protection of Iran confirmed the new law and publicly announced it, updating and replacing the previous law.

==== Japan ====
Revelations that hundreds of workers had died in Japan over the previous few decades from diseases related to asbestos sparked a scandal in mid-2005. Tokyo had, in 1971, ordered companies handling asbestos to install ventilators and check health regularly; however, the Japanese government did not ban crocidolite and amosite until 1995, and a near-complete ban with a few exceptions on asbestos was implemented in 2006, with the remaining exceptions being removed in March 2012 for a full-fledged ban.

==== New Zealand ====
In 1984, the import of raw amphibole (blue and brown) asbestos into New Zealand was banned. In 2002, the import of chrysotile (white) asbestos was also banned. In 2015, the government announced that the importation of asbestos would be completely banned with very limited exceptions (expected to be applied to replacement parts for older machines) that would be reviewed on a case-by-case basis.

North-west of Nelson, in the Upper Takaka Valley, is New Zealand's only commercially harvested asbestos mine. A low-grade Chrysotile was mined here from 1908 to 1917, but only 100 tons were washed and taken out by packhorse. A new power scheme enabled work to renew, and between 1940 and 1949, the Hume Company mined 40 tons a month. This continued to 1964, when, due to the short length of its fibre, the limited commercial viability forced mining to cease.

==== South Korea ====
In May 1997, the manufacture and use of crocidolite and amosite, commonly known as blue and brown asbestos, were fully banned in South Korea. In January 2009, a full-fledged ban on all types of asbestos occurred when the government banned the manufacture, import, sale, storage, transport, or use of asbestos or any substance containing more than 0.1% of asbestos. In 2011, South Korea became the world's sixth country to enact an asbestos harm aid act, which entitles any Korean citizen to free lifetime medical care as well as monthly income from the government if they are diagnosed with an asbestos-related disease.

==== United Kingdom ====
In the United Kingdom, blue and brown asbestos materials were banned outright in 1985, while the import, sale, and secondhand reuse of white asbestos was outlawed in 1999. The 2012 Control of Asbestos Regulations, updating and replacing the previous 2006 law, state that owners of non-domestic buildings (e.g., factories and offices) have a "duty to manage" asbestos on the premises by making themselves aware of its presence and ensuring the material does not deteriorate, removing it if necessary. Employers, e.g., construction companies, whose operatives may come into contact with asbestos, must also provide annual asbestos training to their workers.

=== Countries where asbestos is legal ===
Country
United States
Belarus
Kazakhstan
Russia
India
Sri Lanka
Pakistan
China
Cuba
Mexico
Vietnam

==== United States ====
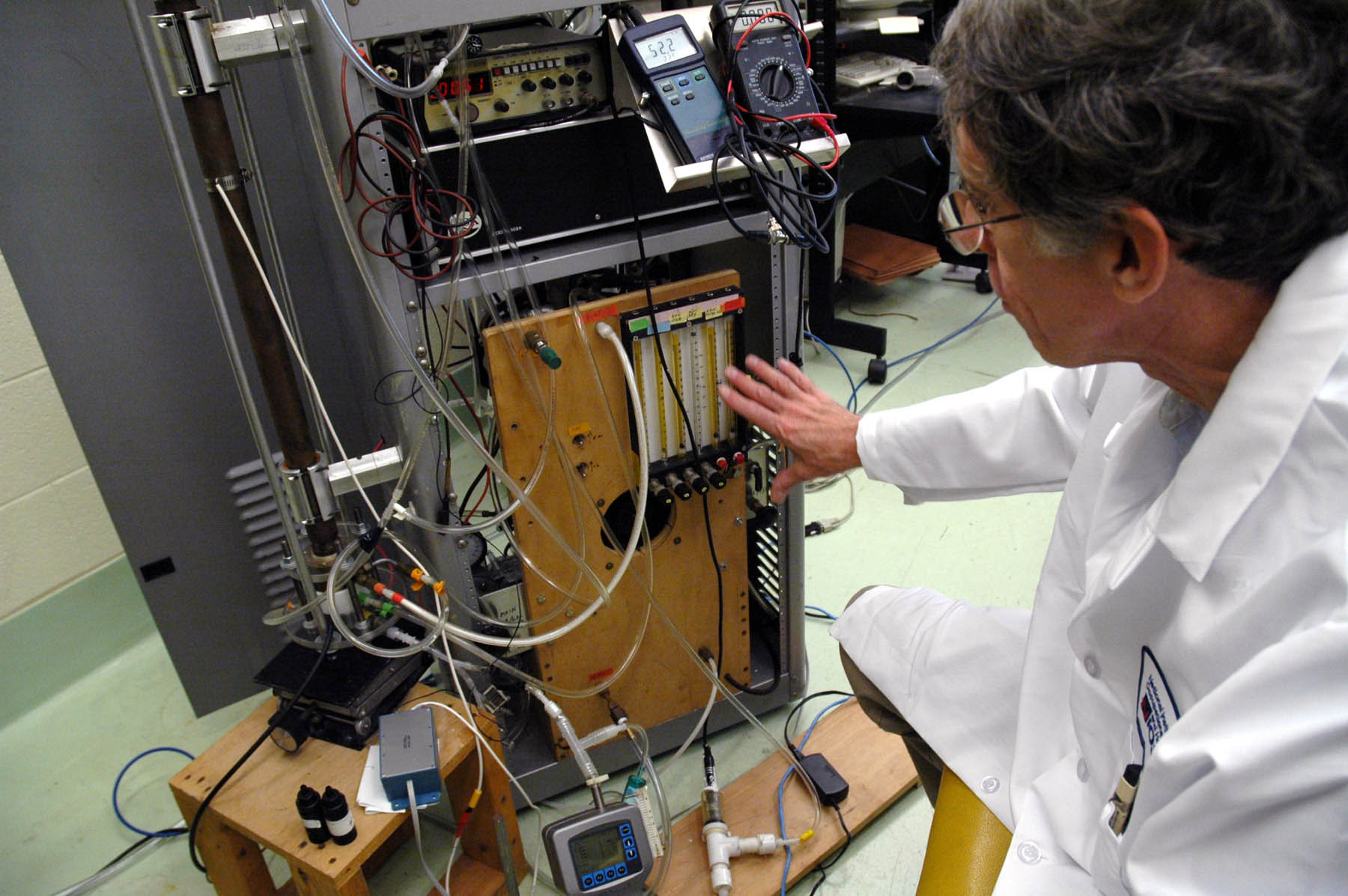
Researcher using a fiber length classifier to produce length-selected fibers of asbestos for toxicological studies

Since 2024, the United States has banned chrysotile asbestos, the only type of asbestos still used in the country. However, it would remain legal to import other types of asbestos. Companies would be required to notify the E.P.A. beforehand, and the agency would have the authority to deny those imports. Before 2024, the United States remained one of the few developed countries to not completely ban asbestos. Some American workers at chlorine plants frequently came in contact with the substance, and OSHA exempted these plants from random inspections through the Voluntary Protection Program.

In 1989, the United States Environmental Protection Agency (EPA) issued the Asbestos Ban and Phase-Out Rule. In 1991, asbestos industry supporters challenged and overturned the ban in a landmark lawsuit: Corrosion Proof Fittings v. Environmental Protection Agency. Although the case resulted in several small victories for asbestos regulation, the EPA ultimately did not put an end to asbestos use. The ruling left many consumer products that can still legally contain trace amounts of asbestos. Six categories of asbestos-containing products are however banned: corrugated paper, rollboard, commercial paper, specialty paper, flooring felt and any new uses of asbestos. The Clean Air Act also bans asbestos pipe insulation and asbestos block insulation on components such as boilers and hot water tanks, and spray-applied surfacing asbestos-containing materials. The Consumer Product Safety Act bans asbestos in artificial fireplace embers and wall patching compounds. The Food and Drug Administration bans asbestos-containing filters in pharmaceutical manufacturing, processing, and packing.

In 2014, the state of Washington banned asbestos in automotive brakes.

In 2022, 224 metric tons (220 long tons; 247 short tons) of chrysotile asbestos were imported into the United States from Brazil and Russia for use in diaphragms used to produce chlorine by the chloralkali process. As of 2020, imported goods containing asbestos included gaskets for some utility vehicles, rubber sheets used in gasket manufacturing, brake blocks for the oil industry, and vehicle friction materials such as aftermarket automotive brakes and linings.

In 2024, the EPA announced the Part 1 Chrysotile Asbestos rule banning chrysotile in six conditions of use by 2037. In response to ongoing asbestos imports and use, the Alan Reinstein Ban Asbestos Now (ARBAN) Act (S.2811, H.R.5373) has been reintroduced in Congress. The American Public Health Association, Asbestos Disease Awareness Organization (ADAO), Environmental Working Group, Collegium Ramazzini, the International Association of Fire Fighters, and others are early supporters.

==== China ====
China has banned the use of highly carcinogenic Amphibole Asbestos since 2002. However, Chrysotile Asbestos is still in use. To safeguard the occupational health of workers, China has promulgated a standard that establishes occupational exposure limits for asbestos.

==== Mexico ====
Since 1970, as a result of increased regulation of asbestos in Europe and in the United States, there was a massive transfer of asbestos-processing enterprises to Mexico. Asbestos is used in many products – roofing, boilers, pipes, brakes, and wires- produced by over 2,000 Mexican companies, many of them subsidiaries or subcontractors of US companies, and sold throughout the Americas. In 2000, 58% of Mexican asbestos-containing exports went to the United States, and 40% to Central American countries and Cuba.

==== Vietnam ====
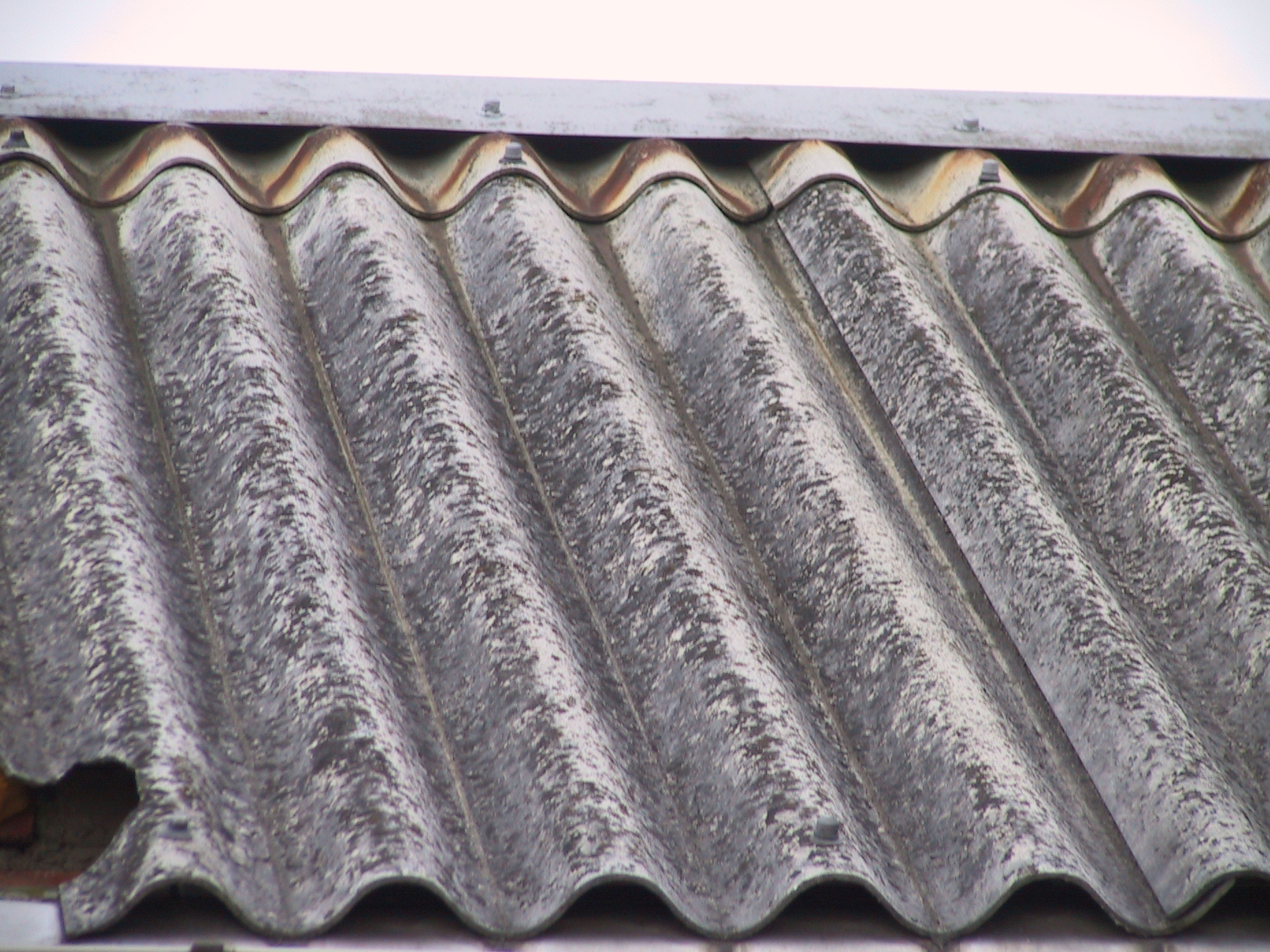
Corrugated asbestos roof (with Fibre cement)

In Vietnam, chrysotile asbestos is not banned and is still widely used. Amphibole asbestos is banned from trade and use. Vietnam is one of the top 10 asbestos users in the world, with an annual import volume of about 65,000–70,000 tons of chrysotile. About 90% of the imported asbestos is used to produce about 100 million m^{2} of cement roofing sheets (asbestos-cement). According to one study, among 300 families in Yen Bai, Thanh Hoa, 85% of households use asbestos roofing sheets, but only 5% know about the negative health effects.

The master plan (for construction materials development to 2020 with orientation to 2030 submitted by the Ministry of Construction to the Government in January 2014) still suggests continued use of chrysotile for a long time.

== Testing ==
The "Cincinnati method", or EPA/600/R-04/004, involves putting a sample of vermiculite into a large beaker of water, and then examining both the sunk and suspended particles using an optical microscope.

It is also possible to detect asbestos in vermiculite by grinding the sample into a powder and then using an electron microscope.

== Substitutes in construction ==
Fiberglass insulation was invented in 1938 and is now the most commonly used type of insulation material. The safety of this material has also been called into question due to similarities in material structure. However, the International Agency for Research on Cancer removed fiberglass from its list of possible human carcinogens in 2001. A scientific review article from 2011 claimed epidemiology data was inconsistent and concluded that the IARC's decision to downgrade the carcinogenic potential of fiberglass was valid, although this study was funded by a sponsored research contract from the North American Insulation Manufacturer's Association.

In 1978, a highly texturized fiberglass fabric, called Zetex, was invented by Bal Dixit. It is less dense than asbestos but offers the same bulk, thickness, hand feel, and abrasion resistance. The fiberglass was texturized to eliminate some of the problems that arise with fiberglass, such as poor abrasion resistance and poor seam strength.

In Europe, mineral wool and glass wool are the main insulators in houses.

Many companies that produced asbestos-cement products that were reinforced with asbestos fibers have developed products incorporating organic fibers. One such product, known as "Eternit", and another, "Everite", now use "Nutec" which consists of organic fibers, portland cement and silica. Cement-bonded wood fiber is another substitute. Stone fibers are used in gaskets and friction materials.

Another potential fire-resistant material is polybenzimidazole or PBI. Polybenzimidazole fiber is a synthetic fiber which has a high melting point of 760 °C (1,400 °F) and does not ignite. Because of its exceptional thermal and chemical stability, it is often used by fire departments and space agencies.

== Recycling and disposal ==
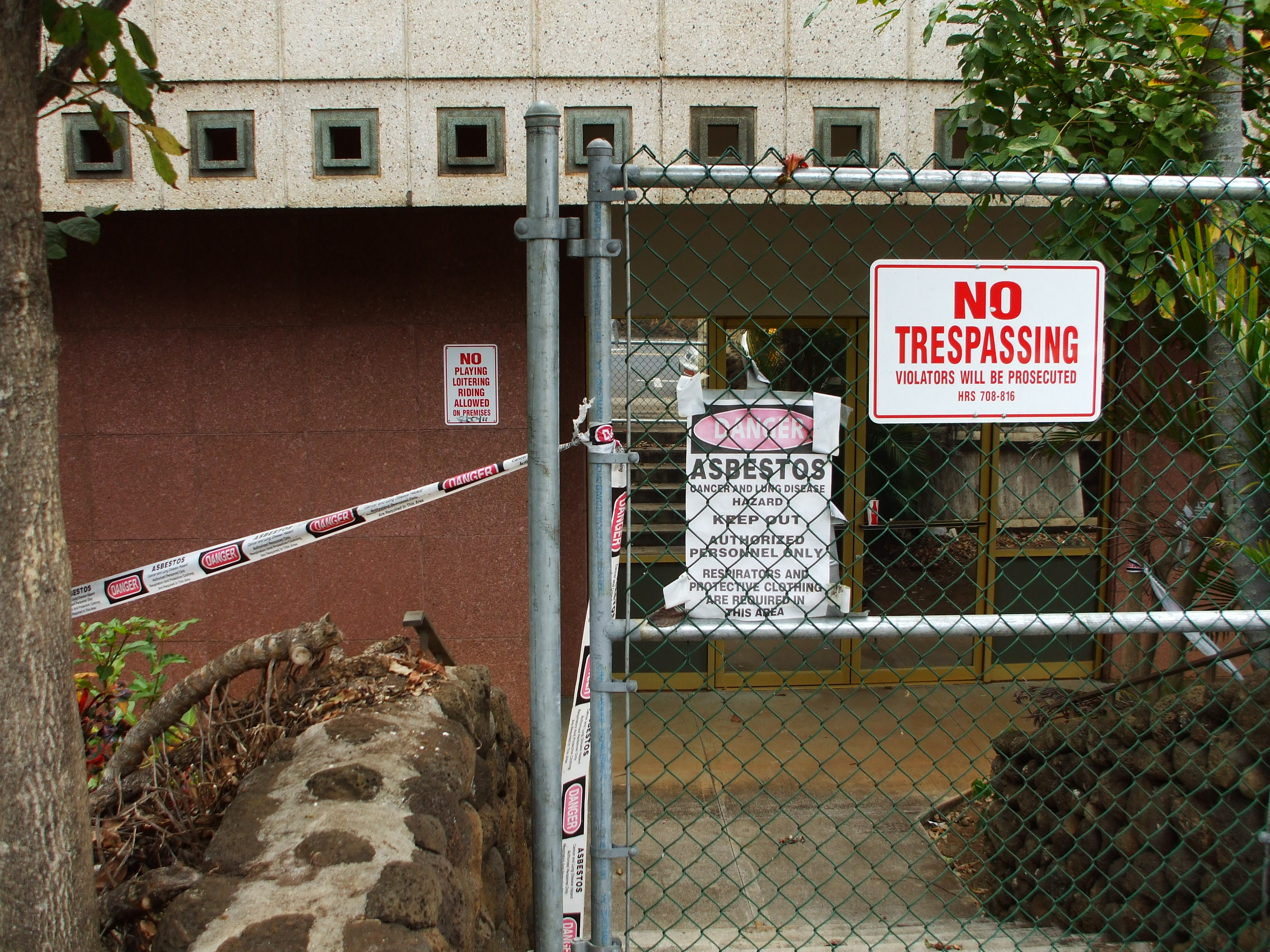
Wailuku, Hawaii post office sealed off for asbestos removal

In most developed countries, asbestos is typically disposed of as hazardous waste in designated landfill sites.

The demolition of buildings containing large amounts of asbestos-based materials poses particular problems for builders and property developers. Such buildings often have to be deconstructed piece by piece, or the asbestos has to be painstakingly removed before the structure can be razed by mechanical or explosive means. One such example is the Red Road Flats in Glasgow, Scotland, which used huge amounts of asbestos cement board for wall panelling. British health and safety regulations stipulate that asbestos material has to be removed in specially adapted vehicles and taken to a landfill site with an appropriate permit to accept asbestos, via an approved route, at certain times of the day.

In the United States, the EPA governs the removal and disposal of asbestos strictly. Companies that remove asbestos must comply with EPA licensing. These companies are called EPA-licensed asbestos contractors. Anytime one of these asbestos contractors performs work, a test consultant has to conduct strict testing to ensure the asbestos is completely removed.

Asbestos can be destroyed by ultra-high-temperature incineration and plasma melting process. A process of thermal decomposition at 1,000–1,250 °C (1,800–2,300 °F) produces a mixture of non-hazardous silicon-based wastes, and at temperatures above 1,250 °C (2,300 °F) it produces silicate glass. Microwave thermal treatment can be used in an industrial manufacturing process to transform asbestos and asbestos-containing waste into porcelain stoneware tiles, porous single-fired wall tiles, and ceramic bricks.

The combination of oxalic acid with ultrasound fully degrades chrysotile asbestos fibers.

== Abbreviations ==
- ACM: Asbestos-containing material (technically, material containing more than 1% asbestos)
- AIB: Asbestos insulating board

== See also ==
- Asbestine
- Asbestos abatement
- Asbestos Disease Awareness Organization
- Medical geology
- Mesothelioma Applied Research Foundation
- Red List building materials
- List of anti-asbestos organizations
