= International Association of Heat and Frost Insulators and Allied Workers =

Trade union in United States and Canada

AWIU
- International Association of Heat and Frost Insulators and Allied Workers
- Founded: July 7, 1903
- Headquarters: 9602 Martin Luther King Jr. Hwy., Lanham, Maryland, United States
- Location: United States, Canada
- Members: 30,000
- Key people: Terence M. Larkin, president
- Affiliations: AFL–CIO, CLC, NABTU
- Website: insulators.org

The International Association of Heat and Frost Insulators and Allied Workers (AWIU or Insulators) is a trade union in the United States and Canada, founded in 1903. It is affiliated with the AFL–CIO and the Canadian Labour Congress and the North America's Building Trades Unions.

The union was formerly known as the International Association of Heat and Frost Insulators and Asbestos Workers, but the name was changed to reflect a symbolic new direction away from the hazards of exposure to asbestos. Union members install thermal insulation, firestops, asbestos insulating boards, sound attenuators, and related building systems.

== Presidents ==
1903: A. J. Kennedy
1912: Joseph A. Mullaney
1954: Carlton Sickles
1967: Hugh Mulligan
1967: Albert E. Hutchinson
1972: Andrew T. Haas
1989: William G. Bernard
2001: James A. Grogan
2015: Bud McCourt
2020: Gregory T. Revard
2022: Terence M. Larkin
