= Cleavage (crystal) =

Tendency of crystalline materials to split along favored planes

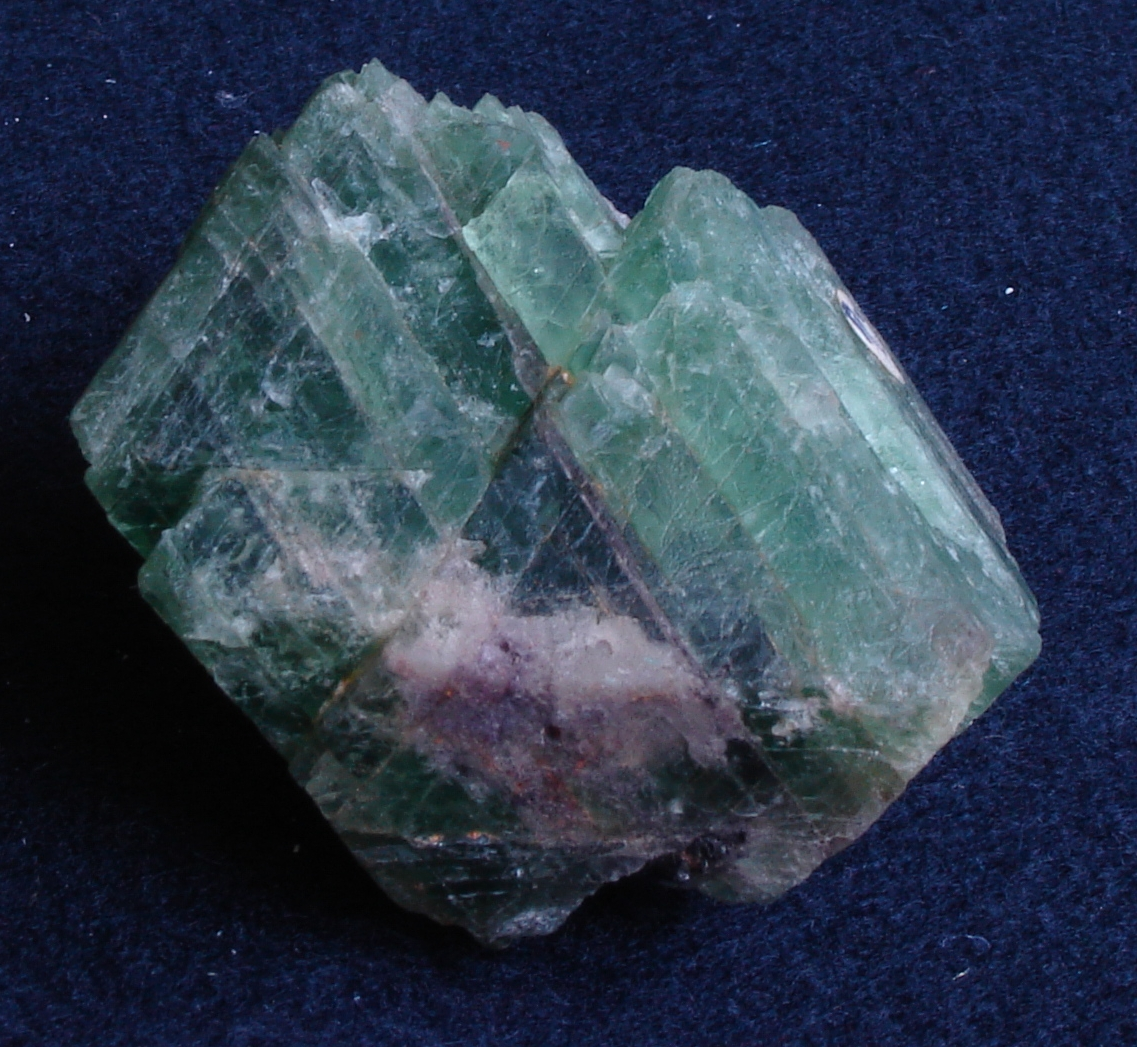
Green fluorite with prominent cleavage

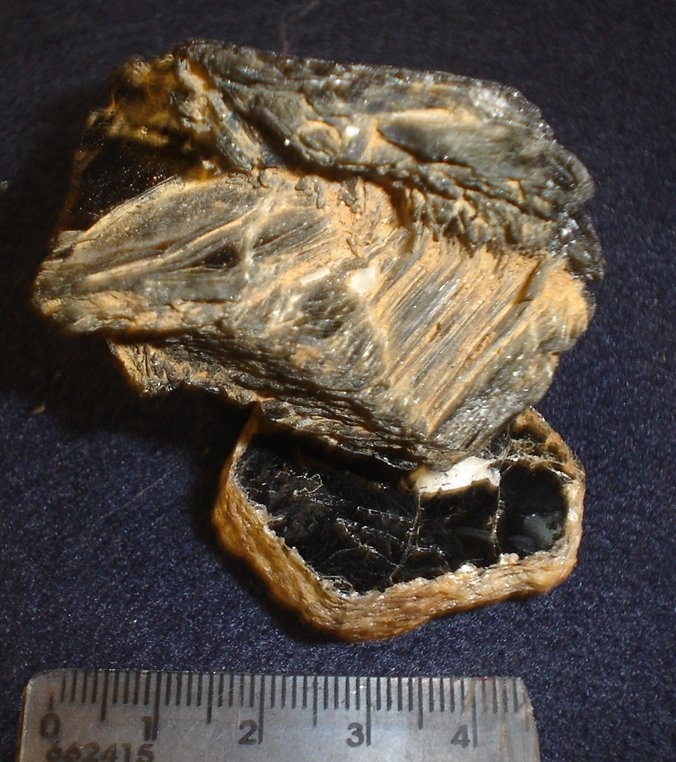
Biotite with basal cleavage

Cleavage, in mineralogy and materials science, is the tendency of crystalline materials to split along definite crystallographic structural planes. These planes of relative weakness are a result of the regular locations of atoms and ions in the crystal, which create smooth repeating surfaces that are visible both in the microscope and to the naked eye. If bonds in certain directions are weaker than others, the crystal will tend to split along the weakly bonded planes. These flat breaks are termed "cleavage". The classic example of cleavage is mica, which cleaves in a single direction along the basal pinacoid, making the layers seem like pages in a book. In fact, mineralogists often refer to "books of mica".

Diamond and graphite provide examples of cleavage. Each is composed solely of a single element, carbon. In diamond, each carbon atom is bonded to four others in a tetrahedral pattern with short covalent bonds. The planes of weakness (cleavage planes) in a diamond are in four directions, following the faces of the octahedron. In graphite, carbon atoms are contained in layers in a hexagonal pattern where the covalent bonds are shorter (and thus even stronger) than those of diamond. However, each layer is connected to the other with a longer and much weaker van der Waals bond. This gives graphite a single direction of cleavage, parallel to the basal pinacoid. So weak is this bond that it is broken with little force, giving graphite a slippery feel as layers shear apart. As a result, graphite makes an excellent dry lubricant.

While all single crystals will show some tendency to split along atomic planes in their crystal structure, if the differences between one direction or another are not large enough, the mineral will not display cleavage. Corundum, for example, displays no cleavage.

== Types of cleavage ==
Miller index {h k ℓ}

Cleavage forms parallel to crystallographic planes:

- Basal, pinacoidal, or planar cleavage occurs when there is only one cleavage plane. Talc has basal cleavage. Mica (like muscovite or biotite) also has basal cleavage; this is why mica can be peeled into thin sheets.
- Prismatic cleavage occurs when there are two cleavage planes in a crystal (but not three). Spodumene is an example where the planes meet at a 90 degree angles. Hornblende is an example where the planes intersect at 56° and 124°.
- Cubic cleavage occurs when there are three cleavage planes intersecting at 90 degrees. Halite (or salt) has cubic cleavage, and therefore, when halite crystals are broken, they will form more cubes.
- Rhombohedral cleavage occurs when there are three cleavage planes intersecting at angles that are not 90 degrees. Calcite has rhombohedral cleavage.
- Octahedral cleavage occurs when there are four cleavage planes in a crystal. Fluorite exhibits perfect octahedral cleavage. Octahedral cleavage is common for semiconductors. Diamond also has octahedral cleavage.
- Dodecahedral cleavage occurs when there are six cleavage planes in a crystal. Sphalerite has dodecahedral cleavage.

== Parting ==
Crystal parting occurs when minerals break along planes of structural weakness due to external stress, along twin composition planes, or along planes of weakness due to the exsolution of another mineral. Parting breaks are very similar in appearance to cleavage, but the cause is different. Cleavage occurs because of design weakness while parting results from growth defects (deviations from the basic crystallographic design). Thus, cleavage will occur in all samples of a particular mineral, while parting is only found in samples with structural defects. Examples of parting include the octahedral parting of magnetite, the rhombohedral and basal parting in corundum, and the basal parting in pyroxenes.

== Uses ==
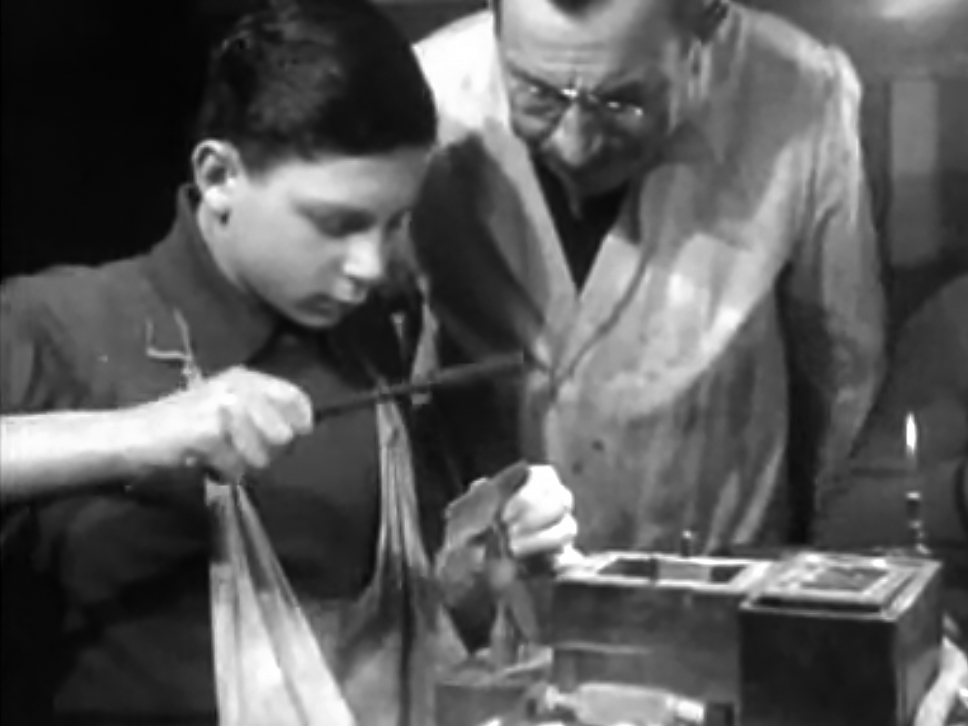
A diamond cutter apprentice cleaving a diamond prior to cutting it, using a steel wedge-like blade and a small club, supervised by a senior cutter in the Netherlands 1946.

Cleavage is a physical property traditionally used in mineral identification, both in hand-sized specimen and microscopic examination of rock and mineral studies. As an example, the angles between the prismatic cleavage planes for the pyroxenes (88–92°) and the amphiboles (56–124°) are diagnostic.

Crystal cleavage is of technical importance in the electronics industry and in the cutting of gemstones.

Precious stones are generally cleaved by impact, as in diamond cutting.

Synthetic single crystals of semiconductor materials are generally sold as thin wafers which are much easier to cleave. Simply pressing a silicon wafer against a soft surface and scratching its edge with a diamond scribe is usually enough to cause cleavage; however, when dicing a wafer to form chips, a procedure of scoring and breaking is often followed for greater control. Elemental semiconductors (silicon, germanium, and diamond) are diamond cubic, a space group for which octahedral cleavage is observed. This means that some orientations of wafer allow near-perfect rectangles to be cleaved. Most other commercial semiconductors (GaAs, InSb, etc.) can be made in the related zinc blende structure, with similar cleavage planes.

== See also ==
- Cleavage (geology)
