= Asbestine =

Mineral compound composed of fibrous magnesium silicate

Asbestine is a mineral compound composed of nearly pure fibrous magnesium silicate, with physical characteristics between those of asbestos and talc. It is used in paper manufacture and construction.

== Applications ==
In antiquity, it was sometimes called linum vivum, and used to take advantage of its fire-resistant properties. These uses included making it into napkins and towels, which, when dirty, were simply thrown into the fire to clean. Historically, it has been used in a cast stone form on house exteriors, such as the Rand House in Minneapolis in 1874. Contemporary applications include use as an extender in paint-based products, although statutory restrictions on how much can be used have long been in place.

== Health concerns ==
Trace amounts can be found in talc, which often contains asbestos fibers of various types. Studies into health risks associated with talc determined that with so many commercial varieties of talc being types of asbestine minerals, the resultant lung disease—talcosis, which can follow their prolonged inhalation, is usually a variety of asbestosis.
