= Bal Dixit =

Researcher and businessman (born 1938)

Bal Dixit (born 1938) is a researcher and businessman working in technical textiles. In 1977, Dixit started work on developing a product he would later call Zetex in response to the impending asbestos ban. This product exhibits many of the properties of asbestos, without the side effects of lung cancer or mesothelioma. In 1978, Dixit founded the company Newtex to market Zetex.

== Early life and education ==
Dixit was born in the village of Katol in central India in 1938. After receiving his degree in Textile Technology from the University of Punjab, he emigrated to the United States in 1964, joining Union Carbide Corporation as an Advanced Technologist. At Union Carbide, Dixit helped develop carbon fiber for lightweight structural composites that were later incorporated in General Dynamics' F-111B fighter aircraft. Dixit earned his master's in Textile Technology from the University of Massachusetts in 1966 and soon after joined Garlock, where he was tasked with establishing a modern asbestos plant in Sherbrooke, Quebec, Canada. Dixit went on to earn an MBA from the Rochester Institute of Technology in 1974.

== His company ==
In 1978, Dixit left Garlock to launch his own company, Newtex Industries, in Victor, New York. At Newtex, he developed Zetex fiberglass fabric, a safe and viable alternative to asbestos. By 1983, Newtex grew to $2.4 million in sales.

Dixit led Newtex from the time he founded the company in 1978 until he stepped down to retire in 2006. At that time, Dixit's son-in-law, Jerry Joliet, took over as President and CEO.

=== "The Dixit Fixit" ===
In 1980, just two days before the annual stockholders' meeting, a large fire caused extensive damage to the Newtex plant. The company was fully operational again 3 weeks after the fire. Newtex employees dubbed the impressive recovery as "The Dixit Fixit", and Dixit's perseverance after the fire was documented in two books by RIT business professor Andrew J. Dubrin, Getting it Done: The Transforming Power of Self-Discipline and The Inner Core of the Resilient Manager.

== Community involvement ==
In 1996, Dixit was appointed Director of the Federal Reserve Bank by Chairman Alan Greenspan. He served as Chairman of the Board of the Buffalo Branch of the Federal Reserve Bank for five years. He also served on the boards of the Rochester General Hospital and the Greater Rochester Chamber of Commerce and has been a Rochester Institute of Technology Trustee.

In June 2018, the Golisano Institute for Sustainability at the Rochester Institute of Technology dedicated the Bal Dixit Laboratory for Advanced Materials and Fire Protection, made possible by a $2 million gift from Dixit.

== Recognition ==
Dixit received the Herbert W. VandenBrul Entrepreneurial Award in 1992 and was inducted into the Rochester Business Hall of Fame in 2003.
