= List of anti-asbestos organizations =

The following are global and local non-profit organizations relating to efforts to ban asbestos use and promote knowledge and understanding of asbestos disease in the community. These are generally community-based groups organized by former asbestos workers, persons with asbestos injuries or surviving family members of injured asbestos workers.

- Asociacion Argentina de Expuestos al Amianto (Argentina)
- Brazilian Asbestos Association (Associacao Braslieira do Amianto)
- Association Belge des Victimes de l'Amiante / Asbest in Belge: Vereniging van Asbestslachtoffers (ABEVA, Belgium)
- Ban Asbestos France (France)
- Associazione Familiari Vittime Amianto (Italy)
- Banjan (BANJAN: Ban Asbestos Network Japan)
- Asbestos Disease Awareness Organization (USA)
