= Asbestos Disease Awareness Organization =

American nonprofit organization

The Asbestos Disease Awareness Organization
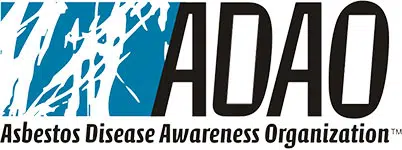
- Founded: 2004
- Founders: Linda Reinstein and Doug Larkin
- Type: 501(c)(3)
- Focus: Public Health
- Location: Redondo Beach, CA
- Website: https://www.asbestosdiseaseawareness.org/

The Asbestos Disease Awareness Organization (ADAO) is a nonprofit organization in the U.S. that helps to prevent asbestos exposure and eliminate all asbestos-related diseases, such as mesothelioma, through education, advocacy, and community initiatives. ADAO was founded by Linda Reinstein and Doug Larkin in 2004 and is headquartered in Redondo Beach, California. Three boards lead it: the Board of Directors, Science Advisory Board, and Prevention Advisory Board.

== Activities ==
The Alan Reinstein Ban Asbestos Now (ARBAN) Act

The Asbestos Disease Awareness Organization has been a leading stakeholder in support of the Alan Reinstein Ban Asbestos Now Act. ADAO co-founder and president Linda Reinstein, widow of Alan Reinstein for whom the bill is named, has spoken publicly in support of the Act. The Alan Reinstein Ban Asbestos Now (ARBAN) Act of 2025 (S. 2811 and H.R. 5373) is a bipartisan bill introduced in the U.S. Congress aiming to ban the importation, manufacture, and use of all asbestos fibers, including chrysotile, amosite, crocidolite, tremolite, actinolite, anthophyllite, winchite, and richterite.

The organization has also:

- Hosted 20 annual Asbestos Awareness and Prevention Conferences.
  - The annual Asbestos Awareness and Prevention Conference brings together experts in medicine, science, law, and policy to share the latest research and strategies for asbestos exposure prevention and disease treatment. The conference also honors asbestos victims and advocates for stronger public health policies.
- Led 20 U.S. Senate National Asbestos Awareness Week (April 1–7) resolutions.
  - The Asbestos Disease Awareness Organization (ADAO) played a role in the passage of twenty U.S. Senate resolutions designating the first week of April 2025 as National Asbestos Awareness Week.
- Organized Global Asbestos Awareness Week (April 1–7) as an annual educational campaign.
  - Since 2005, ADAO has championed Global Asbestos Awareness Week (GAAW). For GAAW 2025, ADAO partnered with national and international organizations such as the Institution of Occupational Safety and Health (IOSH) and the British Occupational Hygiene Society (BOHS).
- Created public service announcements and educational materials on cancer prevention and asbestos exposure avoidance.
- Presented at numerous public health conferences and universities.
- Testified before the U.S. Senate and the U.S. House of Representatives.
