= Asbestos insulating board =

Asbestos-containing board

Asbestos insulating board (AIB), also known by the trade names Asbestolux and Turnabestos, is an asbestos-containing board formerly used in construction for its fire resistance and insulating properties. These boards were commonly used in the United Kingdom from the 1950s until production ended in 1980. AIB is 16-35% asbestos, typically a blend of amosite and chrysotile, though crocidolite was also used in early boards.

AIB is softer, more porous and less dense than asbestos cement. This, and the fact it typically contains a greater proportion of asbestos than the 10-15% of asbestos cement, makes AIB far more friable and thus at greater risk of releasing asbestos fibres if boards are damaged or removed. The inhalation of loose asbestos fibres is linked to various health conditions affecting the lungs, including asbestosis, lung cancer and malignant mesothelioma.
