= Linda Reinstein =

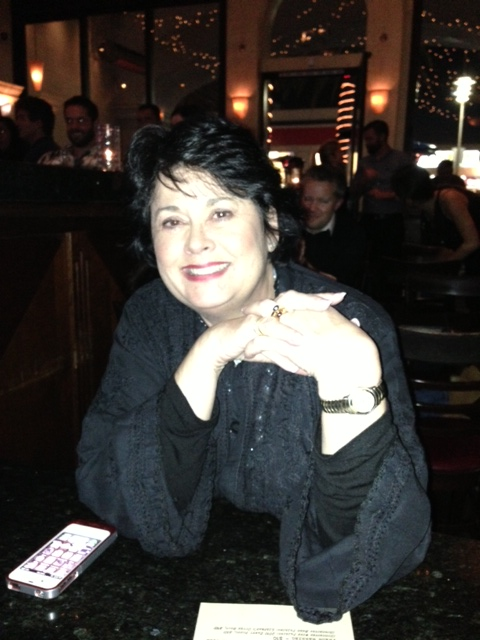
- Born: December 28, 1955 (age 70); San Diego, California
- Occupation: Cofounder of the Asbestos Disease Awareness Organization (ADAO)
- Known for: Public Health and Environmental Justice Advocacy

Linda Reinstein (born December 28, 1955) is an American public health advocate and the co-founder, president, and chief executive officer of the Asbestos Disease Awareness Organization (ADAO), a nonprofit organization dedicated to preventing asbestos exposure and eliminating asbestos-related diseases. She co-founded ADAO in 2004 with Doug Larkin after her husband, Alan Reinstein, was diagnosed with mesothelioma, a cancer caused by asbestos exposure, and continued running the nonprofit after Alan died in 2006. The Alan Reinstein Ban Asbestos Now (ARBAN) Act, federal legislation to prohibit asbestos in the United States, is named for her husband. ARBAN has been introduced in five sessions of Congress since 2017.

Linda Reinstein has testified before committees of the United States Senate and House of Representatives on asbestos and chemical safety policy, advocated for the 2016 Frank R. Lautenberg Chemical Safety for the 21st Century Act, and led ADAO’s litigation against the United States Environmental Protection Agency, including the case that produced the agency’s 2023 asbestos reporting rule and the defense of the EPA’s 2024 chrysotile asbestos ban in the United States Court of Appeals for the Fifth Circuit.

== Advocacy career ==
=== Founding of ADAO ===
Alan Reinstein, a businessman who had been exposed to asbestos while working at a shipyard and during home renovations, was diagnosed with mesothelioma in 2003. During a 2004 trip to Washington, D.C., to support asbestos ban legislation, Linda Reinstein met Doug Larkin, whose father-in-law had also been diagnosed with the disease, and the two founded the Asbestos Disease Awareness Organization. Alan Reinstein died on May 22, 2006. The Hill described Reinstein in a 2016 profile as “not an official lobbyist, but… an advocate, an educator and an activist who testifies before Congress,” reporting that she made ten trips to Washington in a single year.

=== Congressional Testimony and Legislation ===
Reinstein first testified before the Senate Committee on Environment and Public Works hearing, ìExamination of the Health Effects of Asbestos and Methods of Mitigating Such Impacts, on June 12, 2007. She testified before the same committee on July 31, 2013, on reform of the Toxic Substances Control Act (TSCA), and before the House Energy and Commerce Committee’s environment subcommittee on September 18, 2013. On May 8, 2019, she testified at the House Energy and Commerce Committee’s legislative hearing on the ARBAN Act, and on June 9, 2022, at the first Senate legislative hearing on the bill, chaired by Senator Jeff Merkley.

Reinstein advocated for the Frank R. Lautenberg Chemical Safety for the 21st Century Act, the 2016 bipartisan reform of TSCA, and attended its White House signing ceremony on June 22, 2016. A predecessor bill, the Alan Reinstein and Trevor Schaefer Toxic Chemical Protection Act of 2015, also carried her husband’s name.

The ARBAN Act has been introduced in the 115th (2017), 116th (2019), 117th (2022), 118th (2023), and 119th (2025) Congresses, led by Senator Jeff Merkley and Representative Suzanne Bonamici. The 2019 House bill was reported favorably by the House Energy and Commerce Committee by a vote of 47 to 1. The 2025 introduction added Representative Don Bacon of Nebraska as the bill’s first Republican House lead.

Reinstein has worked with congressional offices on the annual United States Senate resolutions designating National Asbestos Awareness Week, first passed in 2005; the 21st consecutive resolution, S.Res.666, passed by unanimous consent on March 27, 2026, led by Senators Merkley and Steve Daines.

=== Global Asbestos Awareness Week and International Work ===
Through ADAO, Reinstein established Global Asbestos Awareness Week, observed April 1 to 7 each year; the 2026 observance was organized with partners including the British Occupational Hygiene Society and the Institution of Occupational Safety and Health, with public service announcements in seven languages. She has spoken internationally, including at the United Nations World Congress on Safety and Health at Work in Turkey, International Mesothelioma Interest Group meetings, and the Global Health and Innovation Conference at Yale University.

=== Litigation ===
In 2018, ADAO petitioned the EPA to require reporting of asbestos imports and use under TSCA, and after the agency denied the petition, ADAO sued. The Northern District of California ruled in Asbestos Disease Awareness Organization v. Wheeler in December 2020 that the EPA’s denial was contrary to its data-collection obligations, and the litigation led to the agency’s July 2023 asbestos reporting rule.

In March 2024, the EPA finalized a rule banning ongoing uses of chrysotile asbestos, which became the first asbestos ban issued under TSCA since 1989. Industry groups challenged the rule, and ADAO intervened to defend the rule and petitioned to strengthen it, leading a coalition of public health organizations and physicians. Reinstein filed declarations supporting the coalition’s standing. The United States Court of Appeals for the Fifth Circuit heard oral arguments for Texas Chemistry Council v. EPA on June 1, 2026.

In 2026, ADAO also sued the EPA over its missed statutory deadline to propose a risk management rule for legacy asbestos under Part 2 of the agency’s asbestos risk evaluation.

=== Conferences ===
ADAO has convened an annual Asbestos Awareness and Prevention Conference since 2005; the 21st conference was scheduled for September 2026 in the Washington, D.C. area.

== Awards and Recognition ==
Reinstein received the Mesothelioma Applied Research Foundation’s Bruce Vento Hope Builder Award in 2011 and was named to The Huffington Post’s “50 Over 50” list in 2014. She became a Board Certified Patient Advocate in 2025.

== Media Appearances ==
Reinstein appeared in the 2018 documentary Dirty Laundry and in a 2019 PBS NewsHour report on asbestos use in the United States. She has been quoted on asbestos policy by ProPublica and NPR in their 2022 reporting on asbestos use in the chlor-alkali industry, by The New York Times in its February 2024 coverage of ADAO’s Times Square billboard campaign with the International Association of Fire Fighters, and by PBS NewsHour in June 2025 on the EPA’s decision not to rewrite the chrysotile ban. She delivered a TEDx talk, “Turning Anger to Action,” in Manhattan Beach, California, in 2010.

== Personal life ==
Reinstein lives in Manhattan Beach, California. She and Alan Reinstein had a daughter, Emily, who was 13 when her father died.
