= Nutec =

Norwegian company

Nutec AS is a Norwegian company working with security and preparedness for emergency exits, fire on oil rigs. Among the activities are education for oil rig workers.
