= Voluntary Protection Program =

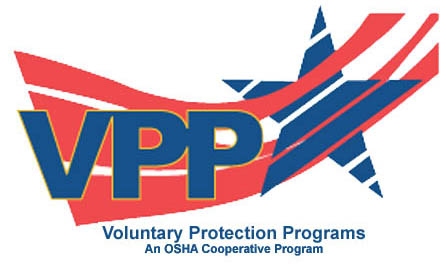
Logo for OSHAs VPP

Voluntary Protection Programs (VPP) is an Occupational Safety and Health Administration (OSHA) initiative that encourages private industry and federal agencies to prevent workplace injuries and illnesses through hazard prevention and control, worksite analysis, training; and cooperation between management and workers. VPP enlists worker involvement to achieve injury and illness rates that are below national Bureau of Labor Statistics averages for their respective industries.

== History ==
Even though the original OSH Act of 1970 included language that discussed the concept of VPP, it didn't start until an experimental California program began in 1979. The OSHA program started in 1982 with the first approved facilities.

== Levels/types of certification ==
VPP offers two levels of certification:

=== Star ===
Star is the highest level. It recognizes employers and employees for developing and implementing continuous improvement workplace safety and health management programs that result in injury/illness rates that are below the national averages for their industries.

=== Merit ===
Merit is for employers and employees that have implemented good safety and health programs but require additional improvements. They must also commit to seeking to advance to Star level within three years.

VPP offers three types of certification:

=== Site-based ===
Site-based Star and Merit certifications are offered for permanent work sites and long-term construction sites. It may also be used to certify resident contractors at participating VPP sites or under a corporate program.

=== Mobile workforce ===
This type of certification is for companies whose employees work on location at various sites.

=== Corporate ===
Large organizations that implement organization-wide health and safety management programs that extend to its individual sites are able to seek corporate VPP certification.

As of 10/31/2012 2,370 entities were registered as VPP certified with the vast majority achieving the Star level. All organizations are re-evaluated every three to five years to remain in the programs.

== See also ==
- Safety and health training
