= Prismatic surface =

In solid geometry, a prismatic surface is a polyhedral surface generated by all the lines that are parallel to a given line and that intersect a polygonal chain in a plane that is not parallel to the given line. The polygonal chain is the directrix of the surface; the parallel lines are its generators (or elements). If the directrix is a convex polygon, then the surface is a closed prismatic surface. The part of a closed prismatic surface between two parallel copies of the directrix is a prism.
