= Geology of North Macedonia =

Topographical map of the Republic of North Macedonia

The geology of North Macedonia includes the study of rocks dating to the Precambrian and a wide array of volcanic, sedimentary and metamorphic rocks formed in the last 539 million years.

== Stratigraphy, tectonics and geological history ==
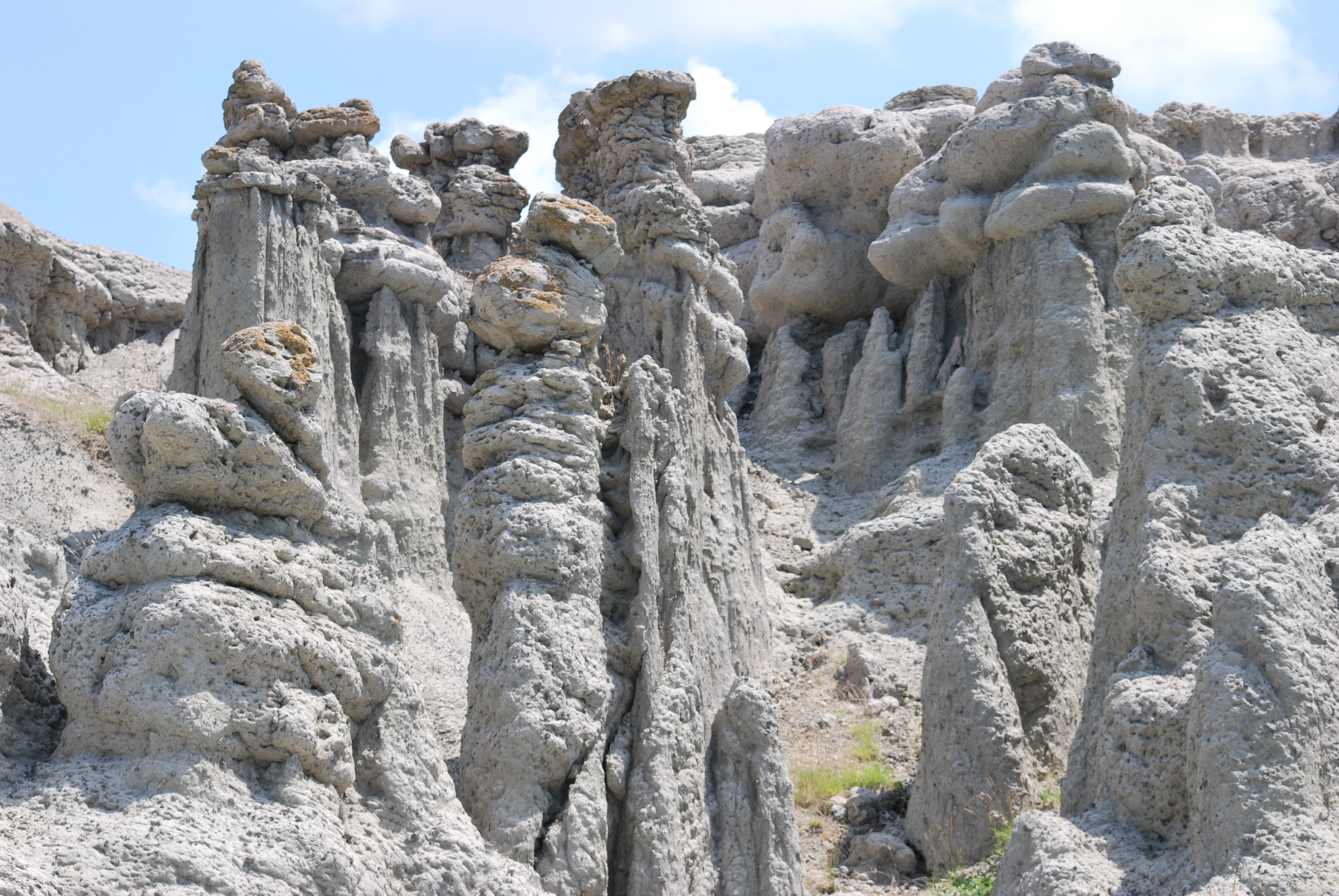
Rock towers at Kuklica

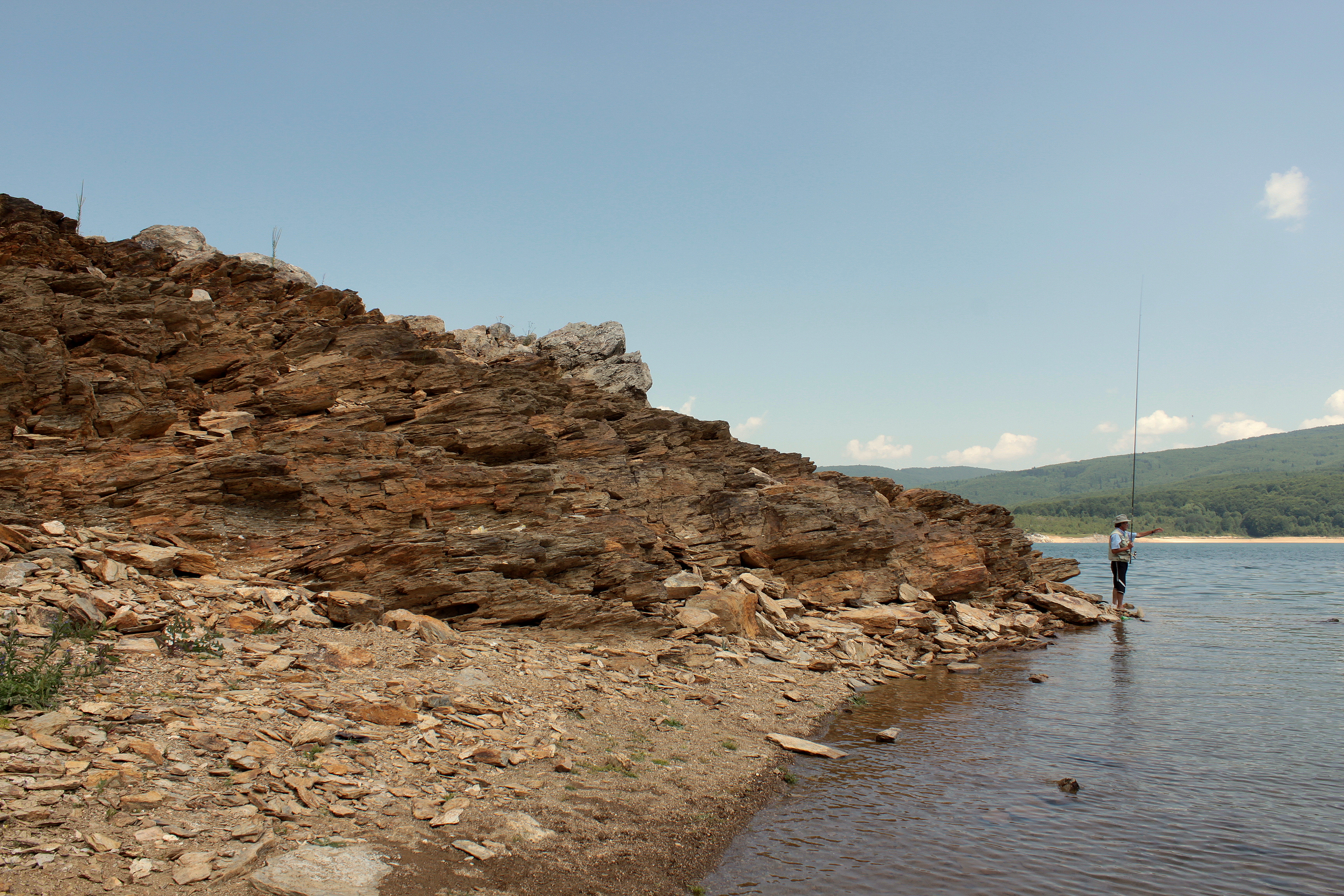
Rocks on the shore of Mavrovo Lake

Geologists have partitioned the country up into four distinct zones (ZMZ - Western Macedonian Zone, PM - Pelagonian Massif, VZ - Vardar Zone, SMM - Serbo-Macedonian Massif) with three major fault lines and pock-marked by two volcanic areas (CKZ - Cukali-Krasta Zone, KZ - Kraistide Zone). Generally, the fault lines strike NNW to S.

Precambrian formations include highly metamorphosed crystalline rocks and are distinguished as Pelagonian Horst Anticlinorium (also known as the Pelagon, or the Pelagonian Massif) together with some blocks in the Vardar Zone. They are widely distributed in the Serbian-Macedonian Massif. The lower part of the segment includes gneiss, biotite, muscovite, magmatized and augen gneiss, metagabbro, eclogite, amphibolite, amphibolite shale and micaceous marble. In the upper segment are different types of mica schist, granite, kyanite and staurolite. The upper Precambrian of the Pelagon Horst Anticlinorium include mixed series of gneiss, mica schist, barite, cipolem, marble and metarhyolite together with calcite and dolomite up to three kilometers thick. Other parts of the Precambrian complex have widely distributed granitoids which in some cases have merged with surrounding gneiss. There are pegmatite and aplite bodies and veins. Granitoids have been dated as one billion to 800 million years old by potassium-argon dating methods and appear to date to the Grenville orogeny period.

The Precambrian complex in the Serbo-Macedonian Massif is made up of gneiss, mica schist and gabbro amphibolite with small masses of marble and metarhyolite. Gneiss is connected to the lower part of the massif and includes minerals such as muscovite, biotite and augen. Mica schist tends to occur in thin bands while gabbro amphibolites represent the metamorphosed magma intrusions and basic rocks with meta-tuff sometimes interspersed with gneiss and mica schist in bands and lenses. In the Pelagon, rocks have Barrovian-type regional metamorphism up to greenschist grade on the sequence of metamorphic facies. In the Serbo-Macedonian Massif, rocks also reach greenschist facies and exhibit Barrovian-type metamorphism.

=== Paleozoic (539-251 million years ago) ===
Paleozoic rocks are widespread in North Macedonia, particularly in the west, including phyllite, volcanic formations and evidence of Riphean through Cambrian, Ordovician, Devonian and Silurian formations based on fossil cephalopods, corals, brachiopods, trilobites and goniatites. Riphean-Cambrian rocks are particularly common in the Serbo-Macedonian Massif, representing sedimentary-volcanic sequences of albite, epidote and chlorite shales, albite-quartz-sericite shales, amphibole metagabbro, and metadiabase, such as the Vlasina Complex in Serbia. Metarhyolites also dominate in the Riphean-Cambrian segment of the Vardar Zone, including phyllite, spilite and keratophyre, epidote-chlorite, spilite-mica schist and low-grade metamorphic shales.

Ordovician rocks are represented by metasediments such as phyllite, sandy phyllite, quartzite sandstone and some shales. The Silurian also has phyllite-like rocks but has a greater proportion of volcanic and quartz porphyry rocks. The Devonian is western North Macedonia is also defined by phyllites, together with graphite shale, conglomerate, quartzite and carbonaceous shales, along with marble containing crinoid fossils. Paleozoic formations in different zones indicate that the lower units are most complex in eastern North Macedonia, while the Ordovician and Devonian formations tend to be less numerous in the Vardar Zone and are generally more present in the west. The Kraistides, a volcanic complex spanning into neighboring Bulgaria dominates some parts of the country, with greenschist, metadiabase and spilite in its lower levels, and phyllite schists in its upper levels.

Paleozoic magma formations include granitoid intrusions in both the west and the east, such as the Pelister Massif, in the west, which is well known to geologists because it breaks through Caledonian orogeny age Paleozoic formations, forming 456 million years ago. It includes biotite, alkali granites and adamellite. The Kruschevo granodiorite is associated with the Hercynian orogeny 289 million years ago representing biotite granite that was impacted by intense metamorphism. The granite here tends to be cataclastic while biotite has largely been transformed into secondary minerals. The Kraistide area in the east has some additional intrusions, including laminated granites and rose-colored granites, together with aplite and quartz porphyry.

Regional metamorphism of Paleozoic rocks in western North Macedonia is characterized by low temperatures and high pressures, particularly Paleozoic rocks during the Alpine orogeny period went through a single period of intense cataclastic metamorphism.

=== Mesozoic (251-66 million years ago) ===
Triassic rocks are mostly found in western North Macedonia, although less in the Vardar Zone, covering only a small area in the Delchevo border zone near Bulgaria. They are mainly volcanic rocks in the lower units overlain by carbonaceous dolomite. Jurassic rocks are particularly common in the Vardar Zone, particularly in the west. In this area, rocks are extremely varied due to ophiolite formations and massifs. The ophiolites are found in serpentinized ultra-mafic masses or sometimes as more complete ophiolite complexes. Apart from ultrabasic rocks, there is also diabase, gabbro, peridotite and basalt. In the Vardar Zone, a series of faults and diapirs are laminated and highly serpentinized. The Radusha Massif is the most significant ophiolite massif, covering an area of 60 square kilometers northwest of Skopje. Chromium ore was extracted from the massif for decades and it also hosts dunite, harzburgite, veins and lenses of gabbro and rodingite. Gabbro-diorites of the ophiolite suite include the Demir Kapija-Gevgelija, Klepa and Skopska Crna Gora massifs in the central part of the Vardar Zone. The Demir Kapija-Gevgelija Massif extends over an area of 400 square kilometers.

Basal conglomerate in the Demir Kapija area are overlain by massive limestones from the Tithonian. Ophiolite-gabbro cumulates are identified as oceanic-type gabbros and basalts are believed to have formed from up to 20 percent pre-existing crustal rock. Among the acidic magmatic intrusive bodies in the area are granites and granodiorites. In the west, in the vicinity of Korab Mountain, is a limestone formation with layers of chert and a flysch formation dominating the sub-soil, made up of claystone, limestone and siltstone. Toward the south is an additional ophiolite complex with similar rocks to the Vardar Zone.

Cretaceous rocks include examples from the Turonian and Senonian. Albian rocks are only found around the southeastern city of Shtip. Flysch is the most common remnant of the Senonian, particularly in the western Vardar Zone (up to three kilometers of alternating conglomerates, sandstones, arkose, marl, limestone and rudist fossils—shifting more toward siltstone in the east). Along the Radika River and Drim River in western North Macedonia, flysch, a carbonaceous sandbar limestone and olistolith limestone blocks outcrop. Cretaceous intrusive bodies include small granite bodies along the Pelagon fault zone, dating to 118 million years ago.

=== Cenozoic (66 million years ago-present) ===
The Cenozoic is represented by Eocene continental and marine deposits, along with volcanic formations from the Neogene and the last 2.5 million years of the Quaternary. Eocene rocks are mainly found in the Vardar Zone, especially close to Delchevo along the Bulgarian border and Debar. Red or violet conglomerate and sandstone make up the lower layers along with molasse formations. They are overlain by alternating sequences of sand and clay flysch with limestone layers rich in Eocene fossils. The Oligocene along the Bulgarian border has quartz latite and dacite rocks. Continental molasse deposited during the Miocene and Pliocene with sand, clay, tuff, volcanic ash, although there are some layers of diatomaceous earth and limestone in the Pelagon area. Marl, 1.5 kilometers thick fills the Skopje valley. Pliocene sands are covered by limestone and travertine which resulted from lake beds and hydrothermal waters. The Zletovo-Kratovo volcanic formation is also from the same period. Small basalt eruptions at the edge of the Vardar Zone in the early Quaternary produced some of the youngest rocks in the country.

== Natural resources ==
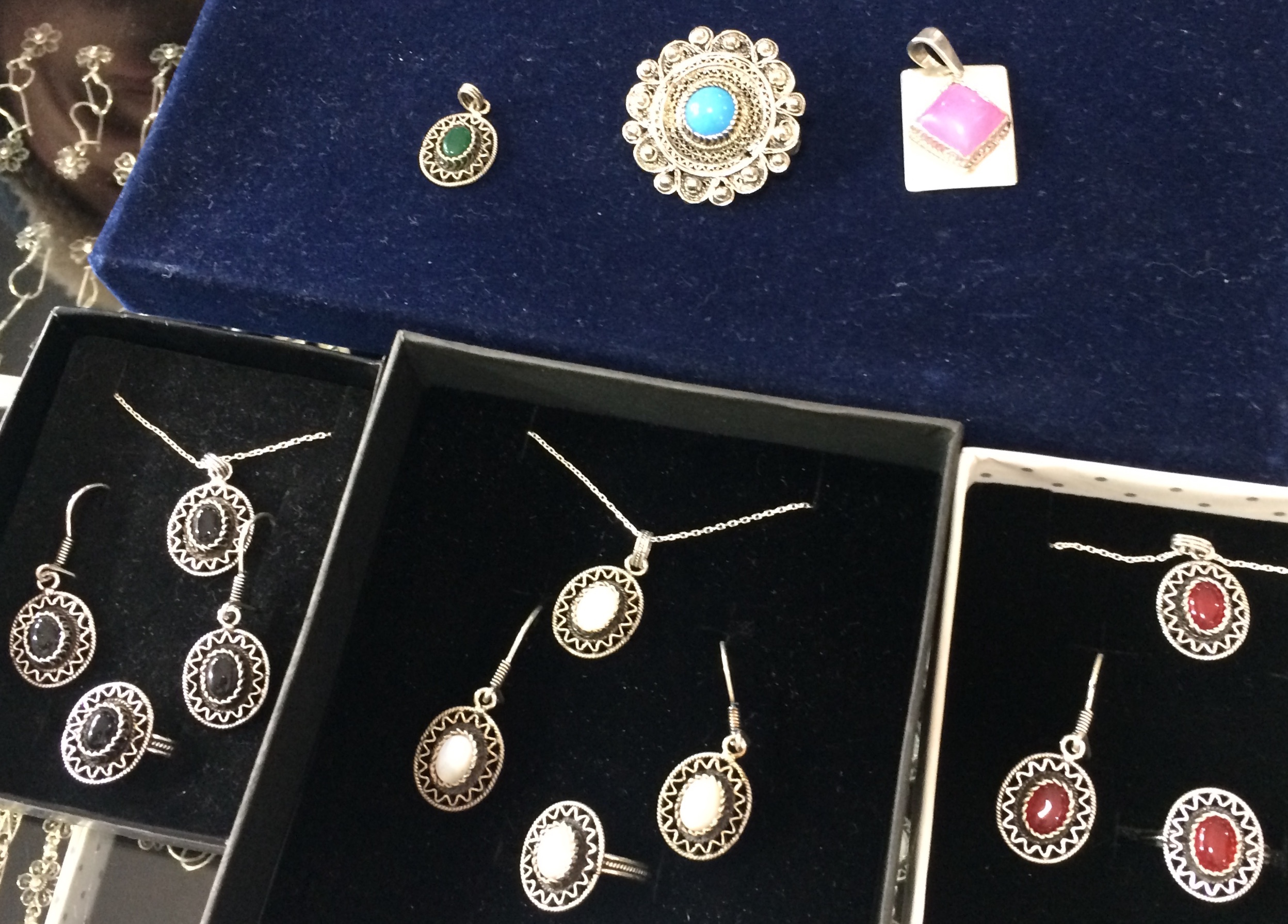
Precious stones of North Macedonia. Clockwise from top brooch: turquoise, pink ruby, garnet, mother-of-pearl, onyx, green garnet

The Olonos-Pindus Zone extends from Montenegro to Rhodes and is a deep allochthon trough, with clastic Triassic sandstone and the Drymos Limestone. The mineral asbestos occurs in joints in Western Macedonia and in the serpentinized edge of the Vourinos Massif. Stibnite is found here. Disseminated copper sulfides are common in veins in Western Macedonia. Alpine cycle sedimentary rocks are situated between the European hinterland in the Serbo-Macedonian Massif, which numbers 28 two-thousand meter peaks within the confines of the country. Landslides are a common occurrence and have caused deaths and economic grief. The country "is characterized by high seismic activity and a relatively frequent occurrence of strong and catastrophic earthquakes". There have been 270 significant earthquakes from 1900 until 2017.

The stone town of Kuklica is an area consisting of over 120 naturally formed stone pillars, located in the village of Kuklica, near Kratovo in North Macedonia. Kratovo, which lies on the slope of Mount Osogovo, is itself located in the basin of an extinct volcano and hosts the Plavica (or Plavitsa) deposit, which has been mined since Roman times.

Mount Osogovo itself is a granitic massif (part of the Serbo-Macedonian Massif) of crystal rocks. The highest peak is named Ruen (Руен, 2251 m), which constitutes the main orthographic knot on the very border between Bulgaria and North Macedonia. It has a prominent volcanic relief made of conic peaks and volcanic tuff and is rich in polymetal ores. There are many legends about the origin of name Osogovo, but the most famous one is that the area was briefly settled by Transylvanian Saxons miners who were mining gold and silver in the region in the past. According to this legend, the name originates from the Old Germanic words "osso" (god) and "gov" (place) which means "a divine place".

Duvalo is (Macedonian: Дувало) is an active geothermal surface feature situated close to the village of Kosel, near Lake Ohrid. It is both a fumarole and a mofetta, and during Ottoman times it was a sulfur mine. Katlanovo has thermal baths, and there is a stone river near Pelister.

In the past, iron, chromium, diatomite, marble, perlite and other resources have been mined in North Macedonia. Lead, zinc, copper, decorative stone and quartzite were mined on a small scale in the 1990s. Uranium ores can be found near Zletovska Reka and Podaresh.

Lorándite was first discovered at the Allchar deposit ("Alshar" to some), near Kavadarci and Mount Kozuf in 1894 and named after Loránd Eötvös, a prominent Hungarian physicist. The Allchar deposit is now mined for thallium, and is the site of more than 50 minerals. Allchar has been mined at least since the 15th century.

In 2017, 13,100 residents out of 13,300 eligible voters in Gevgelija Municipality decided in a referendum against the permission of a gold mine operator that had hoped to exploit an area north-west of the city Gevgelija, along the Konjska river.

The Damjan mine near Radoviš is an iron skarn deposit composed of hematite, magnetite and pyrite, which has evidence of Cu-Au ore. Copper and gold are exploited at Bucim mine (or "Buchim" for some) which is now operated by Solway, and is located in Radovis.

Tajmište Mine, near Kičevo, is an iron ore exploitation conceded to Tajmiste Corporation, which failed to pay fees in May 2020. Sasa mine, which produces mainly zinc and lead, is located on the flank of Mount Osogovo. Up until recently, ferronickel ore was produced by Ržanovo mine (Mount Kozuf) by Feni Industries, a subsidiary of Cunico Resources, but owing to economic circumstance the mine was shuttered and all that remains in production is the refining process, which is located in Kavadarci. The Rzhanovo mine is connected to the Kavadarci smelter by "the world's longest conveyor belt" which measures 36.5 km.

Melcher and Reichl said North Macedonia has "a high potential for chromium and nickel ores".

Debar Mine, in Debar Municipality was once a productive gypsum mine, and has giant crystalline ore.

In 1971 a lead-titanium oxide mineral, Macedonite, was named by Radusinović and Markov.

In 1994, Bermanec et al. discovered centro-symmetric Tilasite near Nezhilovo, in the Pelagonian massif at the upper part of the Babuna river, which lies on the southern flank of the Jakupica range. Nezhilovo is the site for 81 different mineralogic compounds.

In 1996, Bermanec et al. discovered Nezhilovite, a new magnetoplumbite, near the eponymous village.

In 2016, Chukanov et al. discovered ferricoronadite, a new mineral again near the village of Nezhilovo.

The only country in mainland Europe to have naturally occurring rubies is North Macedonia. They can mainly be found around the city of Prilep, for example in the Sivec quarry. The ruby is also included on the National emblem of North Macedonia.

In 2005, Boev Jovanovski Makrevski and Bermanec revealed by infrared spectroscopy that the Sivec mineral assemblage contained deposits in marble of:

1. Almandine
2. Calcite
3. Clinochlore
4. Corundum
5. Diaspore
6. Dolomite
7. Fluorite
8. Kosmatite - either Clintonite or margarite
9. Phlogopite
10. Rutile
11. Muscovite
12. Pyrite
13. Quartz
14. Tourmaline
15. Zoisite

== See also ==
- Stone town of Kuklica
