= Kosmatite =

Mineral

General
- Category: Minerals

Kosmatite is a mineral, which may also be known as komatiite. It occurs at least in North Macedonia. It may or may not contain clintonite or margarite. Near the city of Prilep in the marble series of the Pelagonian Metamorphic Complex the Sivec quarry provides white dolomite marble; within this matrix can be found some very rare silicates including phlogopite, cyrnrite and kosmatite.
