= Bityite =

Phyllosilicate mineral in the brittle mica group

General
- Category: Phyllosilicate minerals
- Group: Mica group, brittle mica group
- Formula: CaLiAl_{2}(AlBeSi_{2})O_{10}(OH)_{2}
- IMA symbol: Bty
- Strunz classification: 9.EC.35
- Dana classification: 71.02.02c.03
- Crystal system: Monoclinic
- Crystal class: Prismatic (2/m) (same H-M symbol)
- Space group: C2/c

Identification
- Color: Pearly white, grayish blue, greenish blue, light brown
- Crystal habit: Dense, micaceous aggregates or rosettes and encrustations
- Cleavage: Perfect micaceous on {001}
- Fracture: Uneven
- Mohs scale hardness: 3
- Luster: Vitreous, pearly on cleavages
- Diaphaneity: Transparent to translucent
- Specific gravity: 5.5
- Optical properties: Biaxial (-)
- Refractive index: nα = 1.651 nβ = 1.659 nγ = 1.661
- Birefringence: δ = 0.010
- 2V angle: Measured: 35° to 52°
- Dispersion: Strong

Bityite is considered a rare mineral, and it is an endmember to the margarite mica sub-group found within the phyllosilicate group. The mineral was first described by Antoine François Alfred Lacroix in 1908, and later its chemical composition was concluded by Professor Hugo Strunz. Bityite has a close association with beryl, and it generally crystallizes in pseudomorphs after it, or in cavities associated with reformed beryl crystals. The mineral is considered a late-stage constituent in lithium bearing pegmatites, and has only been encountered in a few localities throughout the world. The mineral was named by Lacroix after Mt. Bity, Madagascar from where it was first discovered.

== Geologic occurrence ==
The first description of bityite was by Lacroix in 1908. and it was discovered on Mt. Bity, Madagascar within a pegmatite named Sahatany field . It was later found in a feldspar quarry from Londonderry, Western Australia, and further occurrences have been found from the Middle Urals, and three pegmatites in Zimbabwe. And most recently, occurrences from the Pizzo Marcio, Val Vigezzo area in Piedmont, Italy have been discovered. The most recent analysis for bityite found in the literature is for a sample from the Maantienvarsi pegmatite dyke in the Eräjärvi area in Orivesi , southern Finland. The sample from Maantienvarsi occurs in close association with beryl; either in cavities with altered beryl crystals, or as a pseudomorph after beryl. The mineral has been found in cavities with perthic microcline, albitic plagioclase, muscovite and tourmaline; the pseudomorphs filled with bityite have been found to contain amounts of fluorite, bertrandite, fluorapatite, quartz and beryl. The mineral substitutes into portions of beryl crystals, and is either a hydrothermal alteration product or a late stage magmatic mineral.

== Chemical composition ==
The current chemical formula for bityite is CaLiAl_{2}(AlBeSi_{2})O_{10}(OH)_{2}. The mineral was analyzed by Lacroix, and concluded to be a new mineral rich with concentrations of lithium and beryllium. In 1947, Rowledge and Hayton discovered a new mineral from Londonderry, Western Australia with a similar chemical composition; they named it bowleyite. However, mineralogical studies performed by Strunz later confirmed that the chemical composition and properties for bowleyite were actually bityite. A recent chemical analysis found in the literature was performed with heavy liquids on a sample of bityite from the Maantienvarsi dyke to derive a computed formula for bityite based on 24 oxygens; the computed chemical formula is Ca_{1.19}K_{0.03}Na_{0.02}(Li_{1.19}Al_{3.68}Mg_{0.35}Fe_{0.13})_{5.35}(Al_{1.53}Be_{2.21}Si_{4.26})_{8}O_{19.30}(OH)_{4.54}F_{0.16}.

The samples from Mt. Bity, Maantienvarsi, and Londonderry, Western Australia show similar chemical compositions as compared to the computed composition for bityite; the chemical analysis for the three samples and the computed composition are tabulated in the adjacent table.

== Structure ==
The atomic structure derived by X-Ray powder and optical analysis of bityite is that of a two layer modification that also exhibits a complex affinity to twinning. From studies done on mica flakes from the Maantienvarsi sample, the mineral is a two layer-type modification of polytype 2M_{1}. Bityite has a mica structure, shown in adjacent figure, which consists of tetrahedral and octahedral sheets separated by an interlayer cation. The mineral is considered a brittle mica, and it can be distinguished from the true micas by a layer charge per unit of approximately -2.0; in consequence, their interlayer cation is usually calcium or barium. Bityite's structure consists of a coupled substitution it exhibits between the sheets of polyhedra; the coupled substitution of beryllium for aluminium within the tetrahedral sites allows a single lithium substitution for a vacancy without any additional octahedral substitutions. The transfer is completed by creating a tetrahedral sheet composition of Si_{2}BeAl. The coupled substitution of lithium for vacancy and the beryllium for the tetrahedral aluminium maintains all the charges balanced; thereby, resulting in the trioctahedral end member for the margarite sub-group of the phyllosilicate group.

== Physical properties ==
Bityite exhibits a strong pearly luster, and occurs as a fine scaled white yellowish mass which is usually smaller than 0.3mm in diameter; and, its opacity is transparent to translucent. Physical properties analyses conducted with precision photographs using zirconium-filtered molybdenum radiation indicates that bityite exhibits monoclinic symmetry, and is part of the C2/c space group. The unit cell dimensions are a = 4.99 Å, b = 8.68 Å, c = 19.04 Å, β=95.17°, with a volume of 821.33 Å^{3}. The refraction indices measured by the immersion method are α = 1.650, β = 1.658, γ = 1.660 with 2V calculation of 52.9°. Bityite's specific gravity is 3.14, and it has a hardness of 4−4.5 based on Mohs scale of hardness. Bityite's luster is vitreous and pearly on cleavages, and it has a perfect micaceous cleavage on the {001} miller index. Bityite's crystal habit can display thin and pseudohexagonal platy crystals.
