= Kamen Lednik =

Rock glacier in North Macedonia

- Location within North Macedonia Location within Europe
- Interactive map of Kamen Lednik
- Location: Jakupica range, Čaška Municipality, North Macedonia
- Coordinates: 41°42′N 21°26′E
- Area: 0.25 km^{2} (0.097 sq mi)
- Status: stable

Rock Glacier (Macedonian: Камен Ледник, romanized: Kamen Lednik) is a rock glacier on the south flank of the Jakupica range below the eastern face of Solunska Glava in the central part of North Macedonia in Čaška Municipality.

== Geography ==
The glacier's total area is 0.25 km^{2}, which makes it one of the largest in the Balkans. As a result of the freezing and melting processes of the ice in the shattered dolomite outcrops, there are portions and blocks moving towards a segment higher than 500 m and gradually descend through seven whetstones forming four creeps in the segment above the primary source area of the Babuna River, Bogomila Falls.

== See also ==
- Jakupica
