= Prilep ruby =

Ruby from Prilep

Prilep rubies are a variety of corundum found in the dolomitic marbles of the Prilep region in North Macedonia. This occurrence is scientifically notable for its specific mineralogical paragenesis including corundum, diaspore, and margarite.

== Mineralogy and Optical Effects ==
The corundum from Prilep frequently contains tiny oriented inclusions of diaspore (AlO(OH)). These inclusions result from structural epitaxy between the sapphire/ruby matrix and the diaspore lamellae.

Certain specimens exhibit a distinct internal shimmering effect, often silvery or whitish, known as diasporescence. This optical phenomenon is caused by light reflecting off the microscopic planes of the oriented diaspore inclusions.

== Scientific Importance ==
The presence of diaspore inclusions serves as a key diagnostic feature for identifying the geographic origin of these gemstones. This specific type of intergrowth is characteristic of this deposit and is rarely observed with such intensity elsewhere.
