= Alexandrite effect =

Rare colour-changing gemstone

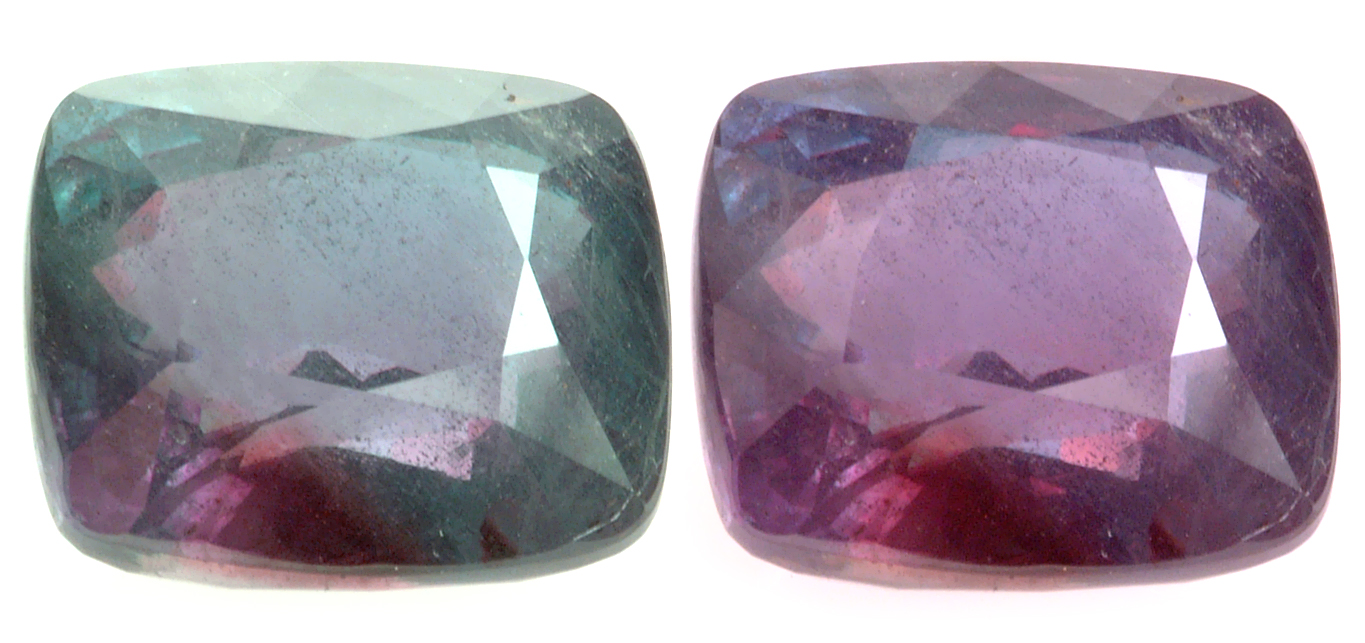
Alexandrite as it appears in daylight (left) and under incandescent light (right).

The Alexandrite effect describes the phenomenon of light-induced colour changes in certain minerals. The effect was named after the alexandrite mineral, but it is also used to refer to similar processes in other minerals. The effect is thought to be caused by a combination of specific light characteristics, the spectral absorption of the mineral, and the sensitivity of the human eye to different wavelengths of light.

Alexandrite appears emerald green in daylight and red in the light emitted by candles and some lightbulbs. The primary structural mechanism involved is the presence of two spectral zones with low absorption and at least one spectral zone affecting intermediary wavelengths with high absorption. The effect is caused by transition metal atoms dispersed in the mineral. In the case of alexandrite, this is usually chromium that is incorporated during the crystallization process through coupled substitution, but other elements such as vanadium, manganese, and iron can also be involved. The incorporated transition metal atoms respond to certain wavelengths of light, which changes the perceived colour. For example, they don't respond to fluorescent lights, as the light they emit is similar to daylight. The atoms respond to warmer lights such as those emitted by candles, producing colour changes.

In determining the apparent colour of a mineral when exposed to a specific light, the characteristics of the human eye are an additional relevant consideration. In general, the human eye is most sensitive to green wavelengths.

The Alexandrite effect has also been observed in some other minerals, such as fluorite, sapphire, kyanite, monazite, spinel, garnet, tourmaline, and rare-earth oxalates.

Not to be confused with the alexandrite effect, some minerals also exhibit pleochroism. The former is a response to different wavelengths of light in general, the latter an optical artifact of crystalline structures.
