= Coronadite =

Lead manganese oxide mineral

coronadite
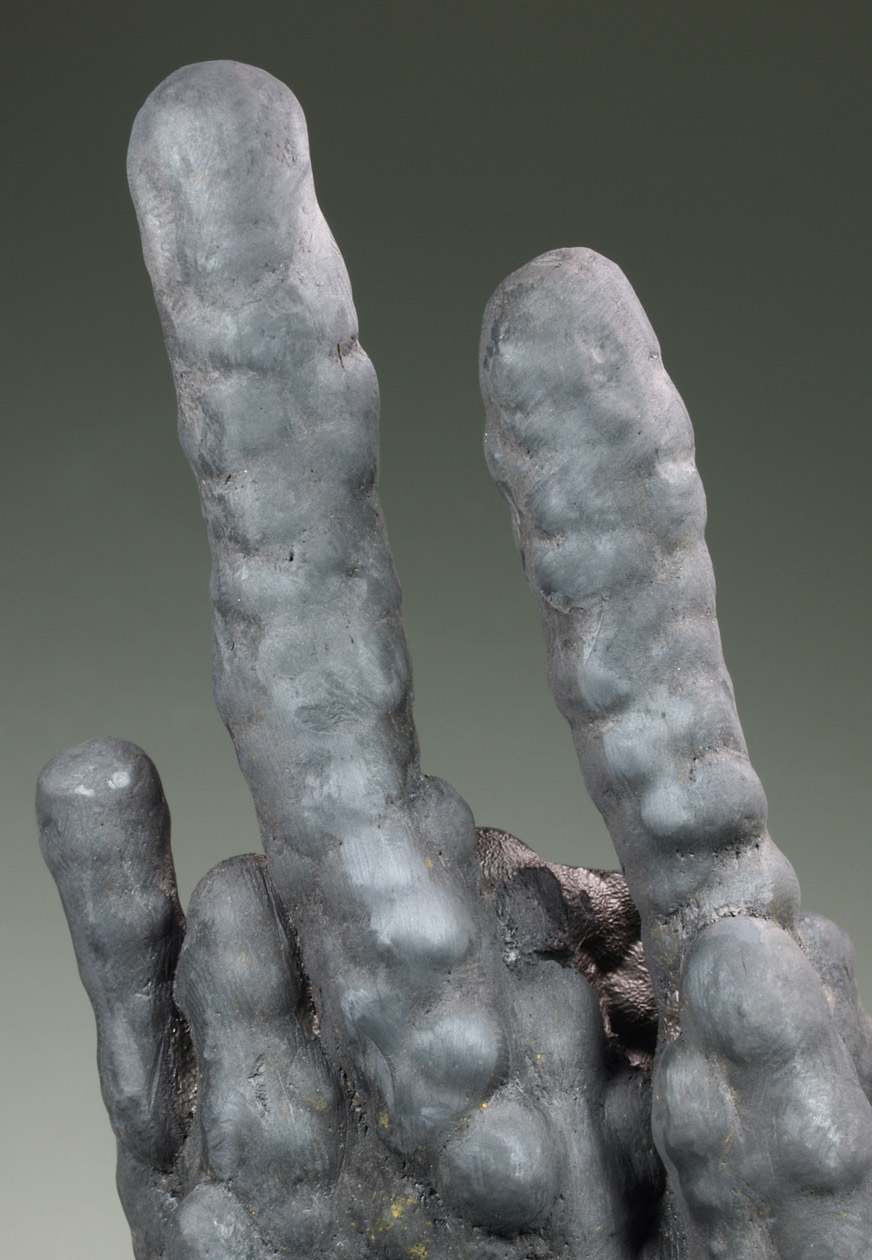
- Coronadita

General
- Category: hydroxides
- Formula: Pb(Mn^{4+}_{6}Mn^{3+}_{2})O_{16}
- IMA symbol: Cor
- Strunz classification: 4.DK.05a
- Dana classification: 7.9.1.4
- Crystal system: monoclinic
- Space group: I2/m
- Unit cell: a = 9.938, b = 2.8678, c = 9.834, Z = 1; β = 90.39° V = 280.26

Identification
- Formula mass: 933.55
- Colour: dark grey to black
- Crystal habit: botryoidal; fibrous
- Mohs scale hardness: 4.5–5
- Luster: submetallic
- Streak: brownish black
- Diaphaneity: opaque
- Density: 5.44
- Refractive index: 2.72?
- Pleochroism: brown-grey
- Common impurities: Fe, Al

Coronadite is the lead endmember of the coronadite group, a family of tectomanganates with a 2 × 2 tunnel structure, isostructural with hollandite.

The mineral was first described by Waldemar Lindgren in 1905, from an occurrence in Arizona, and was named after Francisco Vasquez de Coronado, an explorer of south-west US. It is chemically related to ferricoronadite, an Fe^{+}_{3} analogue, as well as cryptomelane, hollandite, manjiroite and strontiomelane.

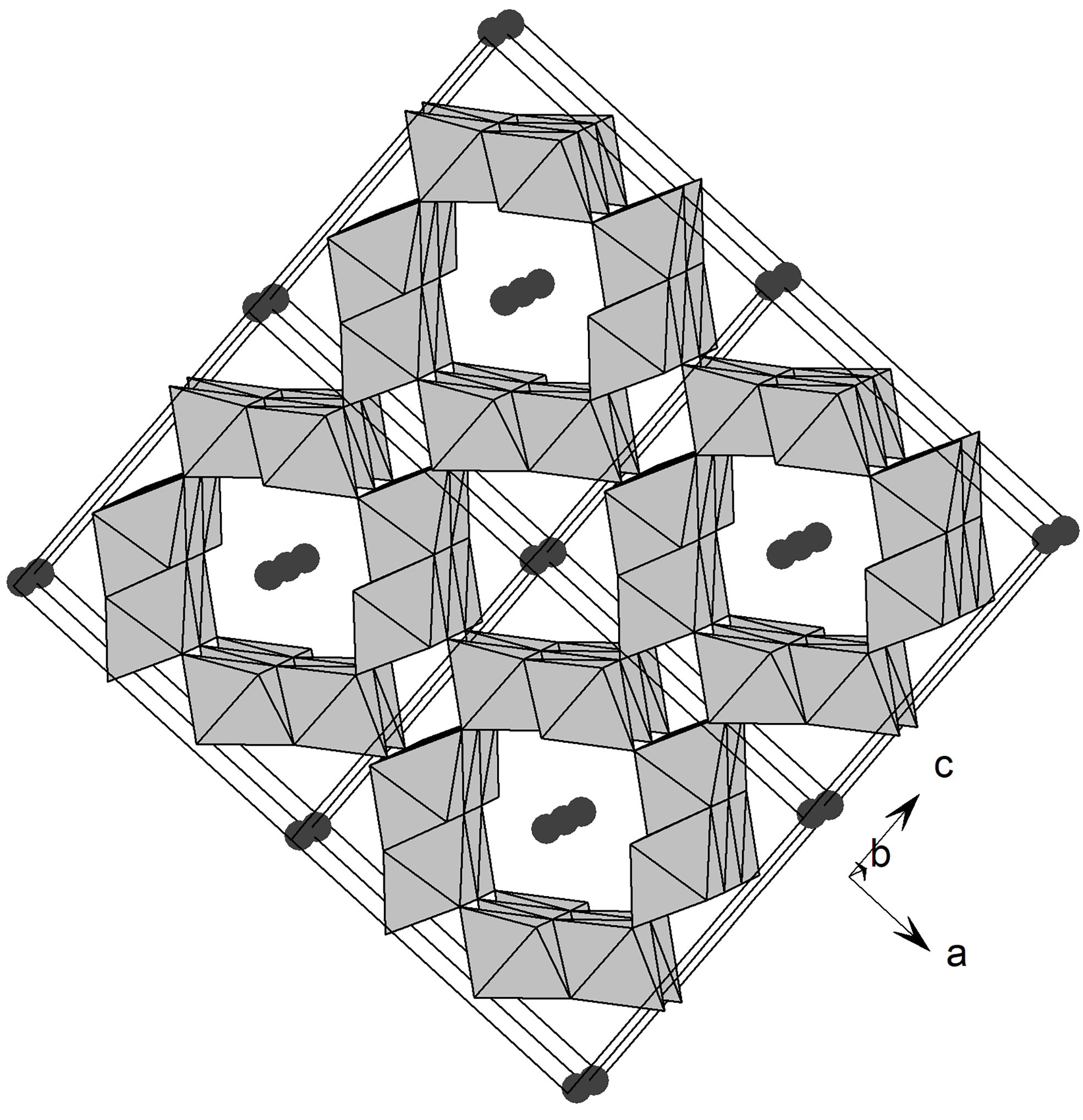
Polyhedral representation of the 2 × 2 tunnel structure of coronadite. The black atoms represent Pb.
