= Babuna =

Babuna may refer to:

- Babuna (mountain), a mountain in North Macedonia
- Babuna (river), a river in North Macedonia
- FK Babuna, a football club in North Macedonia
