= Ferricoronadite =

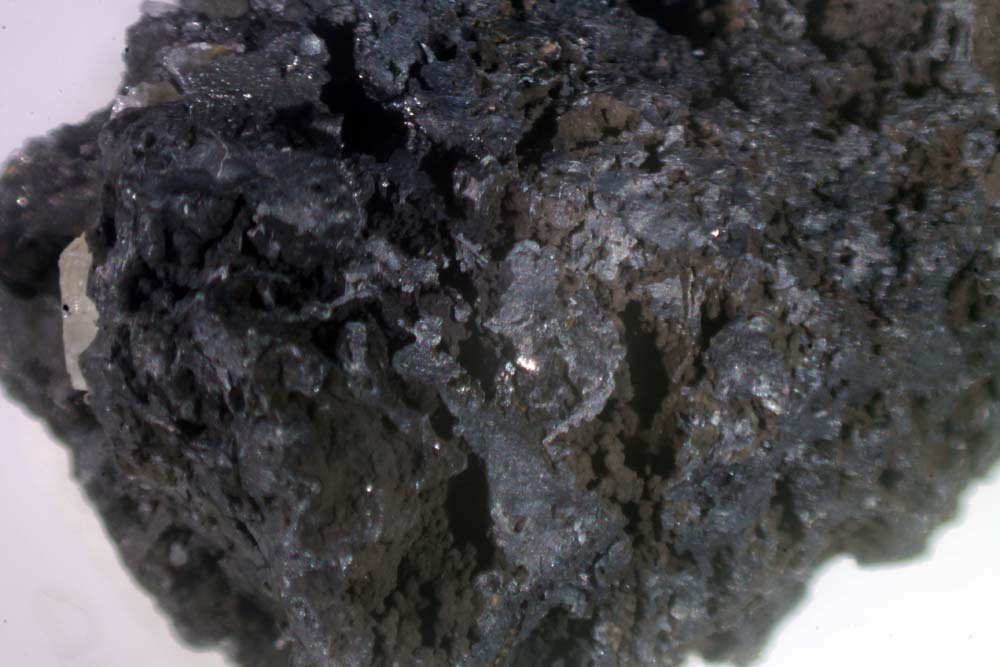
- Greyish brown crystals of the very rare Pb-Mn mineral ferricoronadite (IMA 2015-093) from one of the only two known localities worldwide: Cowshill, Weardale, County Durham, United Kingdom.

General
- Category: Minerals
- Formula: Pb(Mn^{4+}_{6}Fe^{3+}_{2})O_{16}
- IMA symbol: Fcor
- Strunz classification: 4.DK.4.DK
- Crystal system: Tetragonal
- Space group: I4/m
- Unit cell: a = 9.9043 Å, c = 2.8986 Å Z=1

Identification
- Colour: black
- Fracture: uneven
- Tenacity: brittle
- Luster: sub-metallic
- Diaphaneity: Opaque
- Specific gravity: 5.538
- Common impurities: Ba^{2+},Mn^{3+},Ti,Al^{3+}

Ferricoronadite is a lead mineral discovered in 2016 by Chukanov et al. near Nezhilovo, North Macedonia. Its simplified elemental formula is Pb(Mn_{6}^{4+}Fe_{2}^{3+})O_{16}, and it is found in a matrix of zinc-dominant spinels. Ferricoronadite is named as an analogue of coronadite.
