= Nezhilovite =

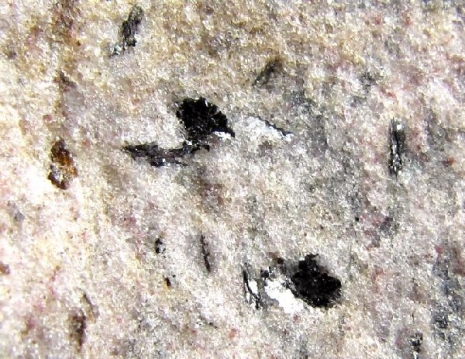
- Nezilovite

General
- Category: Minerals
- Formula: PbZn_{2}(Mn^{4+},Ti^{4+})_{2}Fe_{8}O_{19}
- Strunz classification: 4.CC.45
- Crystal system: Hexagonal
- Space group: P6_{3}/mmc
- Unit cell: a = 5.849 Å, c = 22.809 Å Z=2

Identification
- Colour: black
- Luster: metallic
- Streak: dark brown
- Diaphaneity: opaque
- Specific gravity: 5.69
- Optical properties: Uniaxial (-)
- Pleochroism: no

Nezhilovite is a magnetoplumbite mineral discovered in 1996 by Bermanec et al., who gave it the ideal elemental formula PbZn_{2}(Mn^{4+}, Ti^{4+})_{2}Fe_{8}O_{19}. It forms black magnetic crystals up to 1mm with a tabular, hexagonal outline. The mineral is optically anisotropic, bireflectant and is paramagnetic. The minerals occurs in a matrix of "pink dolomitic marble from a Precambrian metamorphic complex of gneisses, schists and marbles in the Nezhilovo area" of the Pelagonian massif.
