= Begovo Pole =

Kast field in North Macedonia

Coordinates: 41°43′37″N 21°24′50″E

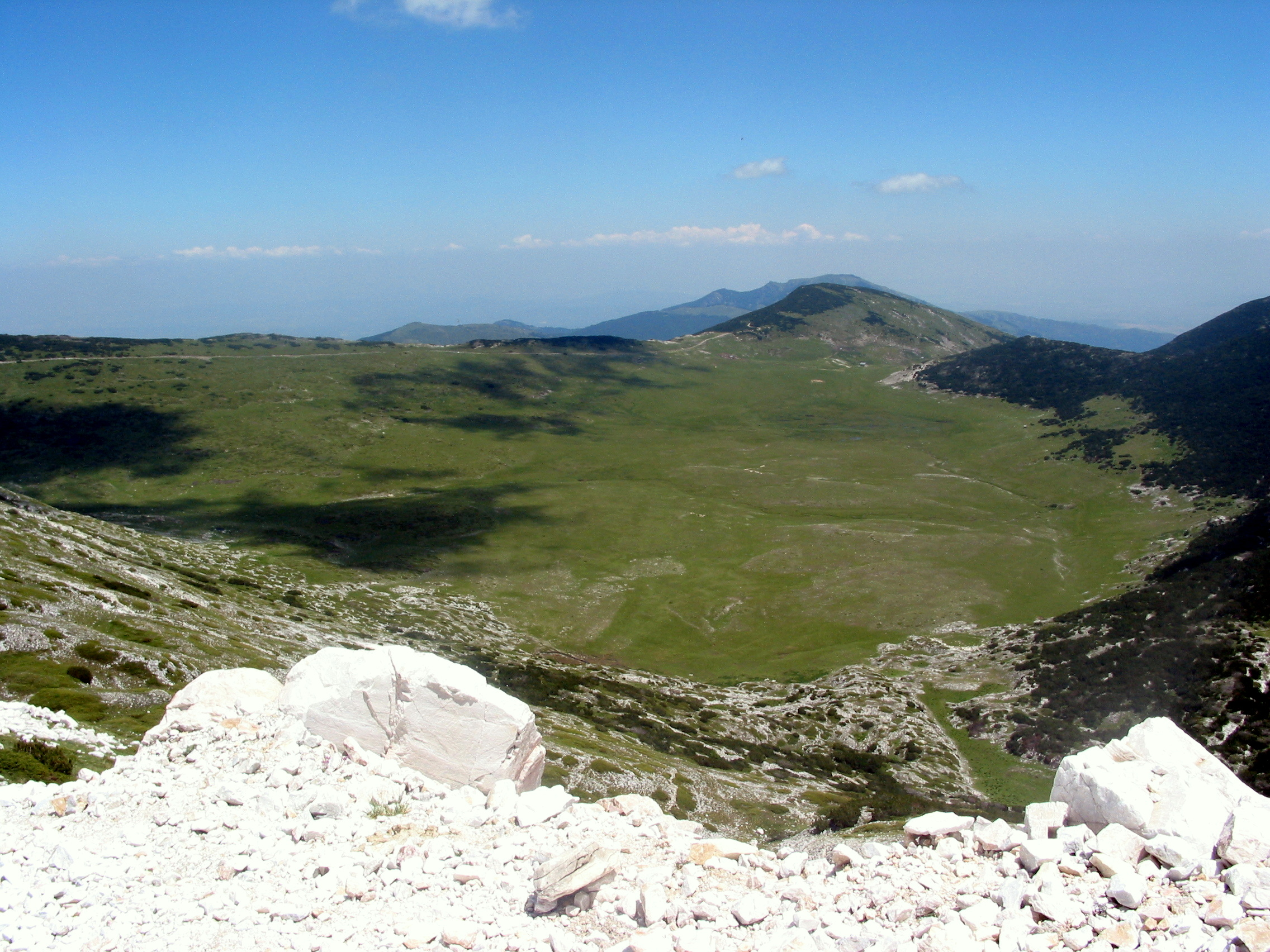
View of Begovo Pole, from Solunska Glava peak

Begovo Pole (Macedonian: Бегово Поле; Albanian: Fusha e Beut) (meaning Bey's field) is a karst field on the Jakupica range, on the north side of peak Solunska Glava, located in central North Macedonia.

The field is 1.5 km long and 500 to 1000 m wide and it is slightly sloped westwards. There is a small stream flowing through it forming a few karst lakes and then loses among the sink holes. The water that is lost on Begovo Pole appears at the springs of Babuna river on the other side of Solunska Glava.

There are several speleological studies conducted on the karst topology around Solunska Glava. It is assumed that beneath the peak there are enormous reservoirs of freshwater, which coincides with the old name for the mountain range Mokra Planina (which translates to Wet Mountain).
