= Strontiomelane =

Mineral

General
- Category: Oxide mineral > Hollandite supergroup
- Formula: Sr(Mn^{4+}_{6}Mn^{3+}_{2})O_{16}
- IMA symbol: Sml
- Strunz classification: 4.DK.05a
- Crystal system: Monoclinic

Identification
- Luster: Sub-Metallic
- Specific gravity: 4.66 g/cm3 (calculated)

Strontiomelane is an oxide mineral from the coronadite group in the hollandite supergroup. Specimens of the mineral appear very similar to other manganese oxides from the same group, such as the Ba-analogue hollandite. The type locality is the Praborna mine in Saint-Marcel, Italy.
