= Daniel Tilas =

Swedish mineralogist (1712 –1772)

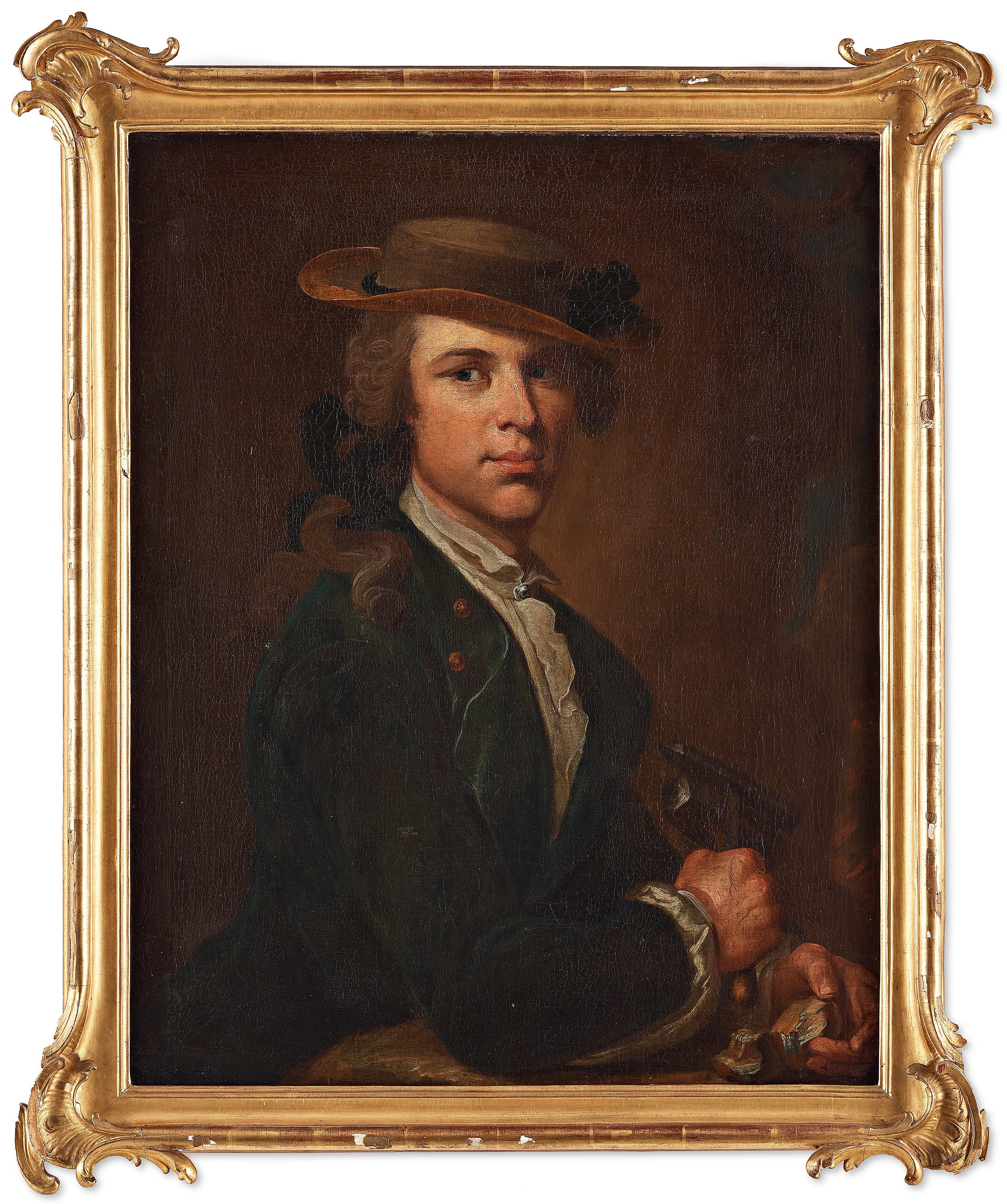
Portrait by Olof Arenius, c. 1750

Daniel Tilas (11 March 1712 – 17 October 1772) was a Swedish mineralogist, mine expert, and an early pioneer of geology. The word feldspar was coined by Tilas although spelled as feldspat in the original. He was also among the early observers of stratigraphy. The mineral Tilasite is named after him.

Tilas was born in Gammelbo, Västmanland, where his father Olof was a wealthy landowner, titled knight in 1719 and his mother Maria was daughter of the scientist Urban Hjärne. He was educated at home by tutors before going to the University of Uppsala in 1723 where he studied natural sciences and Latin, interacting with Carolus Linnaeus. Tilas became an assistant at the Swedish Board of Mines in 1732 where he was involved in administering the Swedish mining industry. He began to map mineral resources and then saw a need to produce a geological map. He inspected mines across the region and made collections of rocks and minerals. The collections and his notes were destroyed when his house caught fire in 1751. He served in the Border Commission and walked the entire stretch between Sweden and Norway from Värmland to Tornio, Lapland. Tilas used the word feldspat do describe the common mineral feldspar in 1740. Hollis Dow Hedberg noted that Tilas had come up with the idea of stratigraphy based on observations in Siljan, where hydrocarbon deposits were thought to have been pushed under the surface by a Devonian meteor impact. He hypothesized, based on his observations of petrochemical deposits, that they were at the same depth across various places, making the case for mapping as a means for identifying new locations for mining. Tilas also suggested that large erratic boulders of geology unconnected to a region may have been moved through drifting sea ice which was later explained in 1795 by James Hutton as having been moved by glaciers.

Tilas was an original member of the Royal Swedish Academy of Sciences founded in 1739 and served as a president. He married Hedvig Reuterholm in 1741 and after her death in 1743, he married Anna Catharina Åkerhielm, both from influential families.
