= Polje =

Type of large plain found in karst regions

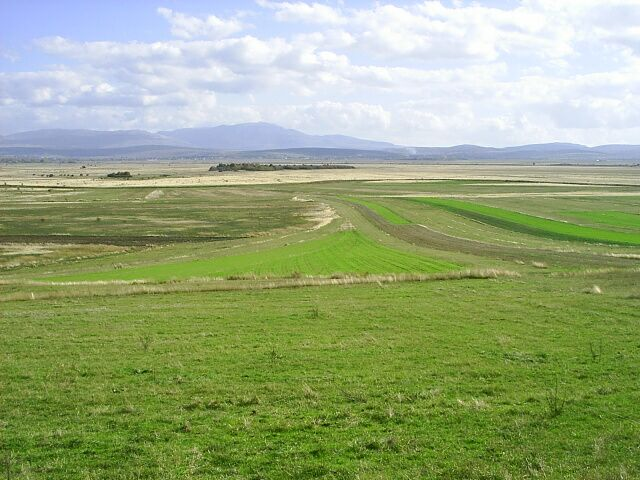
Livanjsko Polje in Bosnia is the largest polje in the world (Mount Dinara visible in the background).

A polje, also called karst polje or karst field, is a large flat plain found in karstic geological regions of the world, with areas usually in the range of 5–400 km^{2} (2–154 sq mi). The name derives from the Slavic languages, where polje literally means 'field', whereas in English polje specifically refers to a karst plain or karst field.

== Geology ==
A polje, in geological terminology, is a large, flat-floored depression within karst limestone, whose long axis develops in parallel with major structural trends and can become several miles (tens of kilometers) long. Superficial deposits tend to accumulate along the floor. Drainage may be either by surface watercourses (as an open polje) or by swallow holes (as a closed polje) or ponors. Usually, the ponors cannot transmit entire flood flows, so many poljes become wet-season lakes. The structure of some poljes is related to the geological structure, often fault lines, complex faults such as grabens and synclines, but others are purely the result of lateral dissolution and planation. The development of poljes is fostered by any blockage in the karst drainage.

A polje covers the flatbottomed lands of closed basins which may extend over large areas, up to 1,000 km^{2}. The flat floor of a polje may consist of bare limestone, of a nonsoluble formation (as with rolling topography), or of soil. A polje typically shows complex hydrogeological characteristics such as exsurgences, estavelles, swallow holes, and lost rivers. In colloquial use, the term "polje" designates flat-bottomed lands which are overgrown or are under cultivation. The Dinaric Karst has many poljes.

They are mostly distributed in subtropical and tropical latitudes but some also appear in temperate or, rarely, boreal regions. Usually covered with thick sediments, called "terra rossa", they are used extensively for agricultural purposes.

Some poljes of the Dinaric Alps are inundated during the rainy winters and spring seasons as masses of water called izvor or vrelo appears at the margins. The water disappears through shafts called ponor.

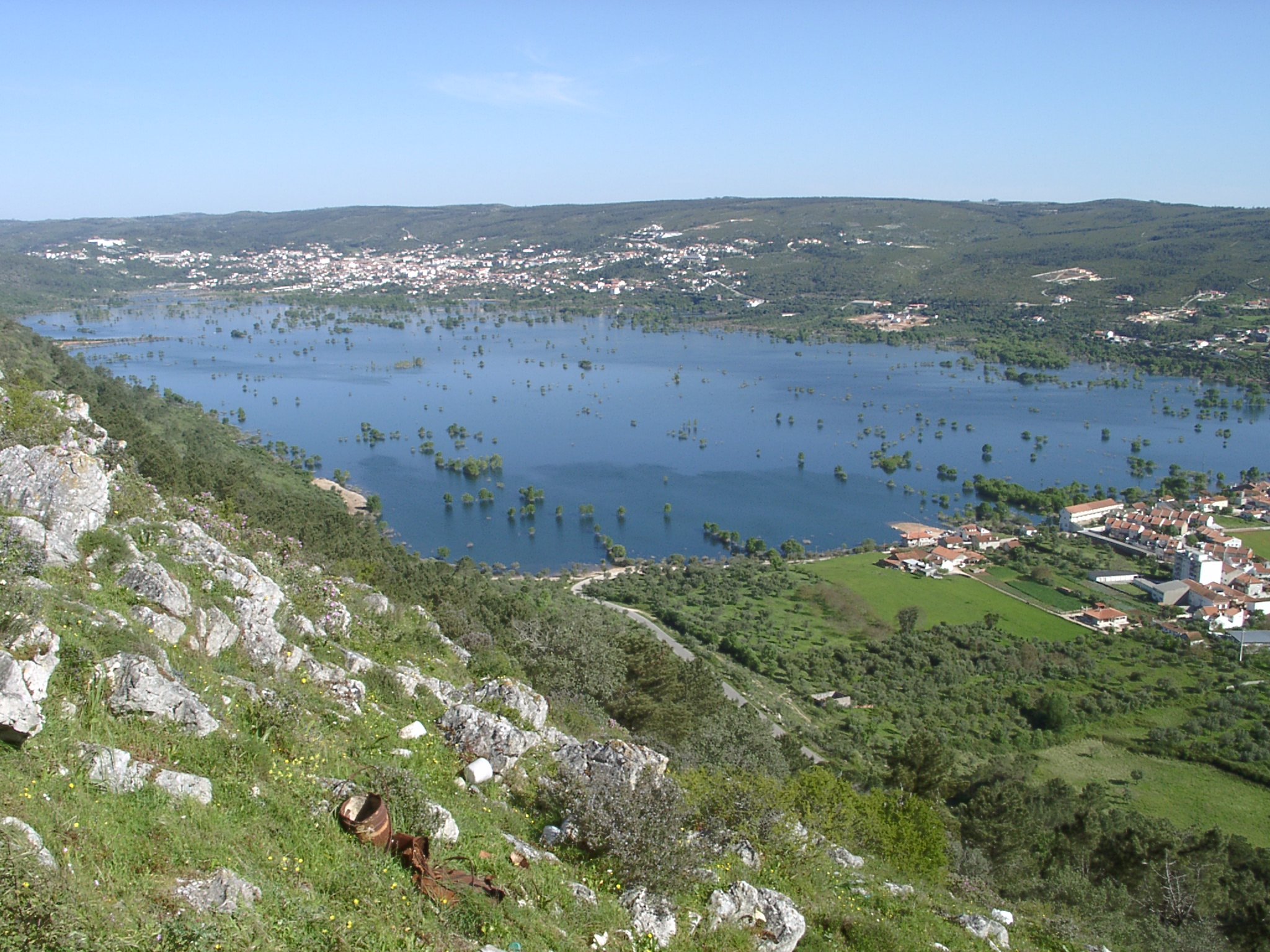
The Minde-Mira de Aire Polje floods in the winter months

Prominent karst poljes are Livanjsko polje (about 60 km long and 7 km wide), Glamočko Polje, Grahovsko Polje, Drvarsko Polje, Duvanjsko Polje, Kupreška Visoravan (Kupres Highlands), Popovo Polje, Dabarsko Polje, Nevesinjsko Polje and Gatačko Polje in Bosnia and Herzegovina; Logatec, Planina, and Cerknica Polje in Slovenia; Grahovsko Polje and Nikšićko Polje in Montenegro; Ličko Polje and Krbava in Lika, Croatia; Begovo Pole in North Macedonia and Odorovsko polje.

In Portugal, the town of Minde is located in a landscape of intensive karst. In the summer the polje is fertile fields, in winter, in case of heavy rain, a temporary lake.

The former Lake Copais in Boeotia, Greece, fed subterranean channels (some artificial) until a 1957 land reclamation project drained it completely.

== Etymology ==
In its original languages, the word is synonymous with interior valley. The word polje (Cyrillic: поље) itself is of Slavic origin (best known as the root for the country Poland, Polska, from the Polish word pole 'field'). English borrowed polje from Slovene or Serbo-Croatian (Cyrillic: поље, pronounced [pôʎe]).
