= Stone town of Kuklica =

Stone formation in North Macedonia

Coordinates: 42°07′28″N 22°03′01″E

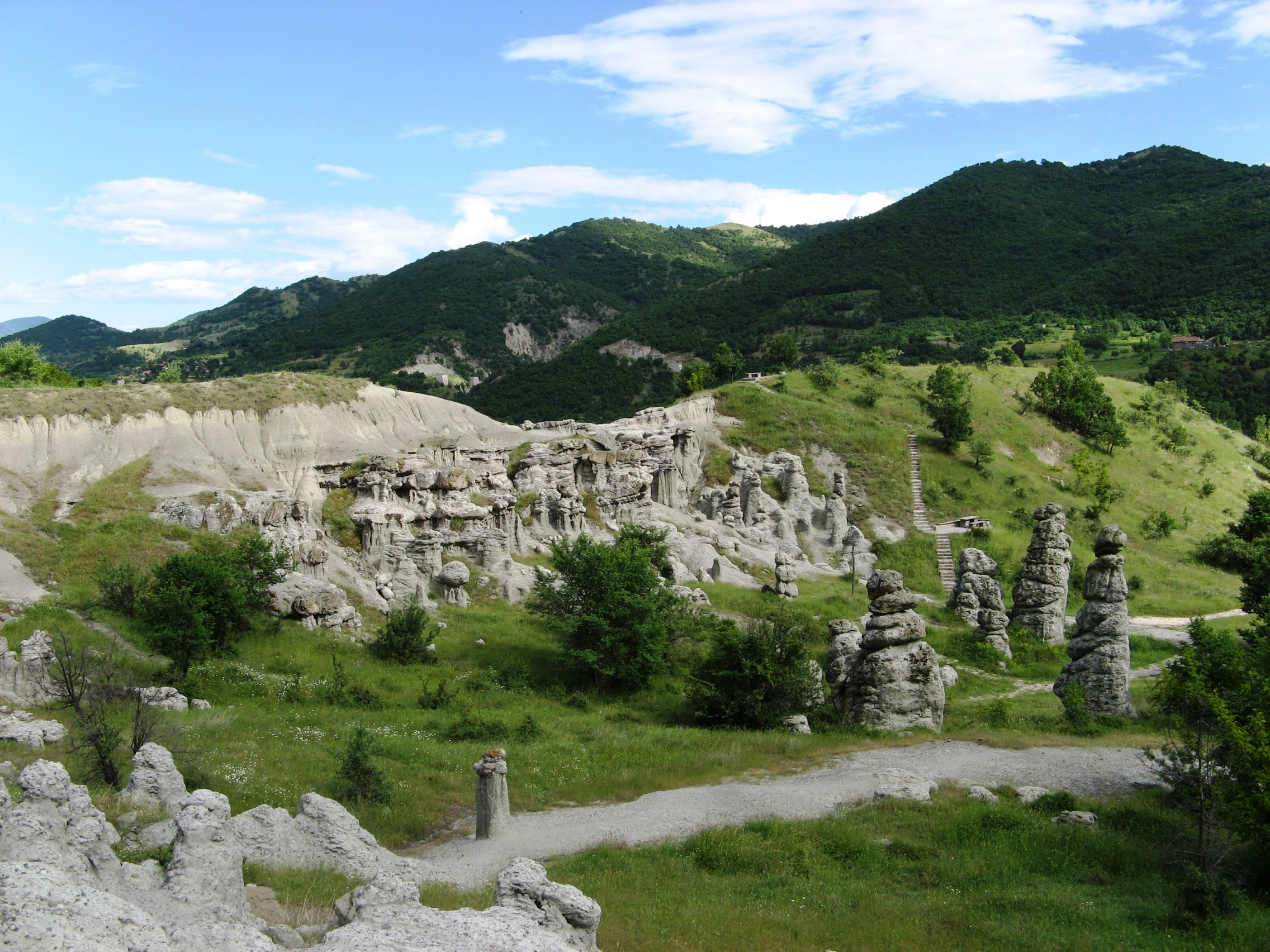
Stone town of Kuklica

The stone town is an area consisting of over 120 naturally formed stone pillars, located in the village of Kuklica, near Kratovo in North Macedonia.

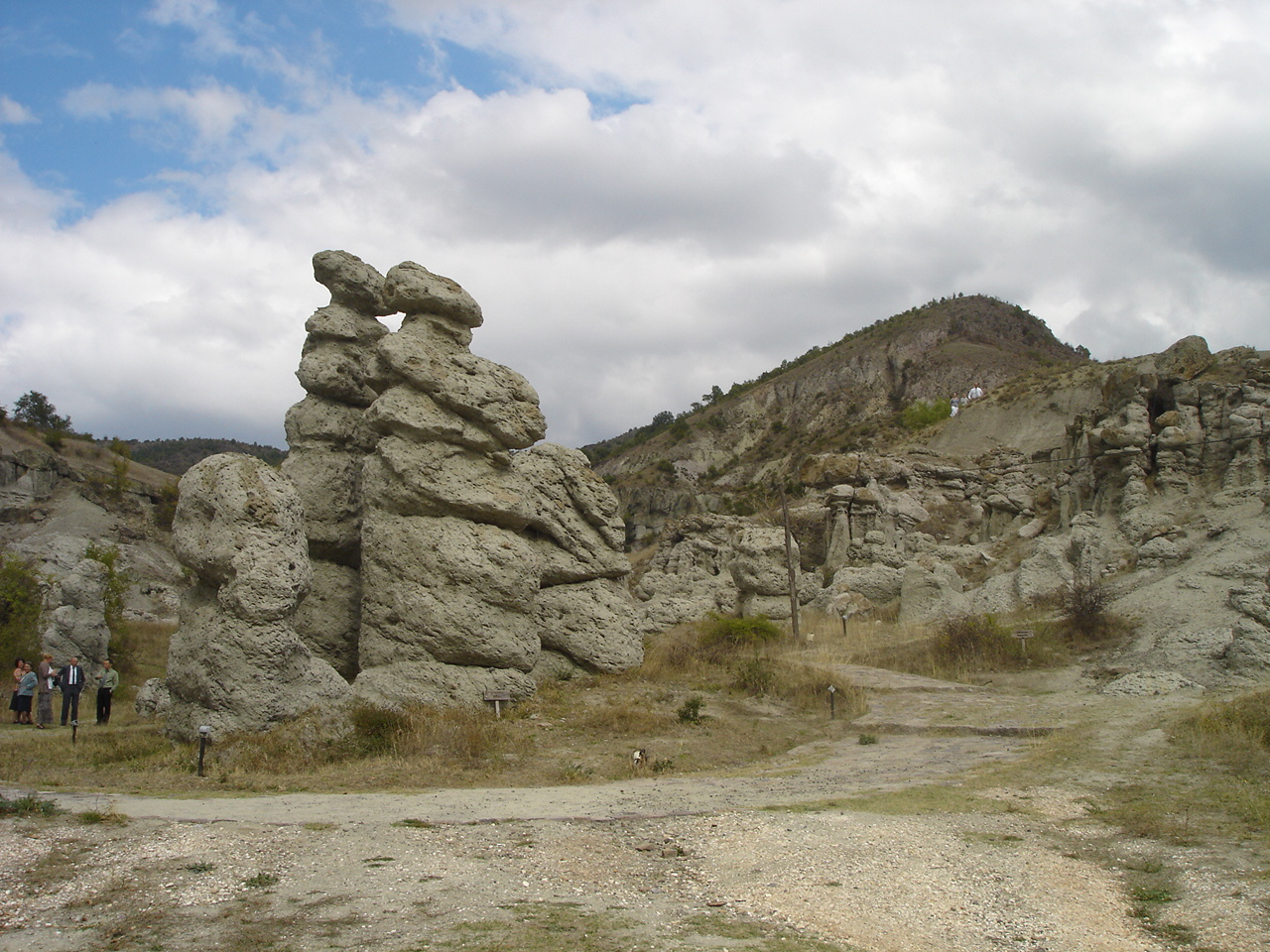
The stone dolls called "The Bride and groom" with the other stones in the background

== Location ==
Kuklica is located 8 km northwest of Kratovo. The stone formations are situated on the right bank of the Kriva River valley. The area has an altitude of 415–420 m and extends over an area of 0.3 square km.

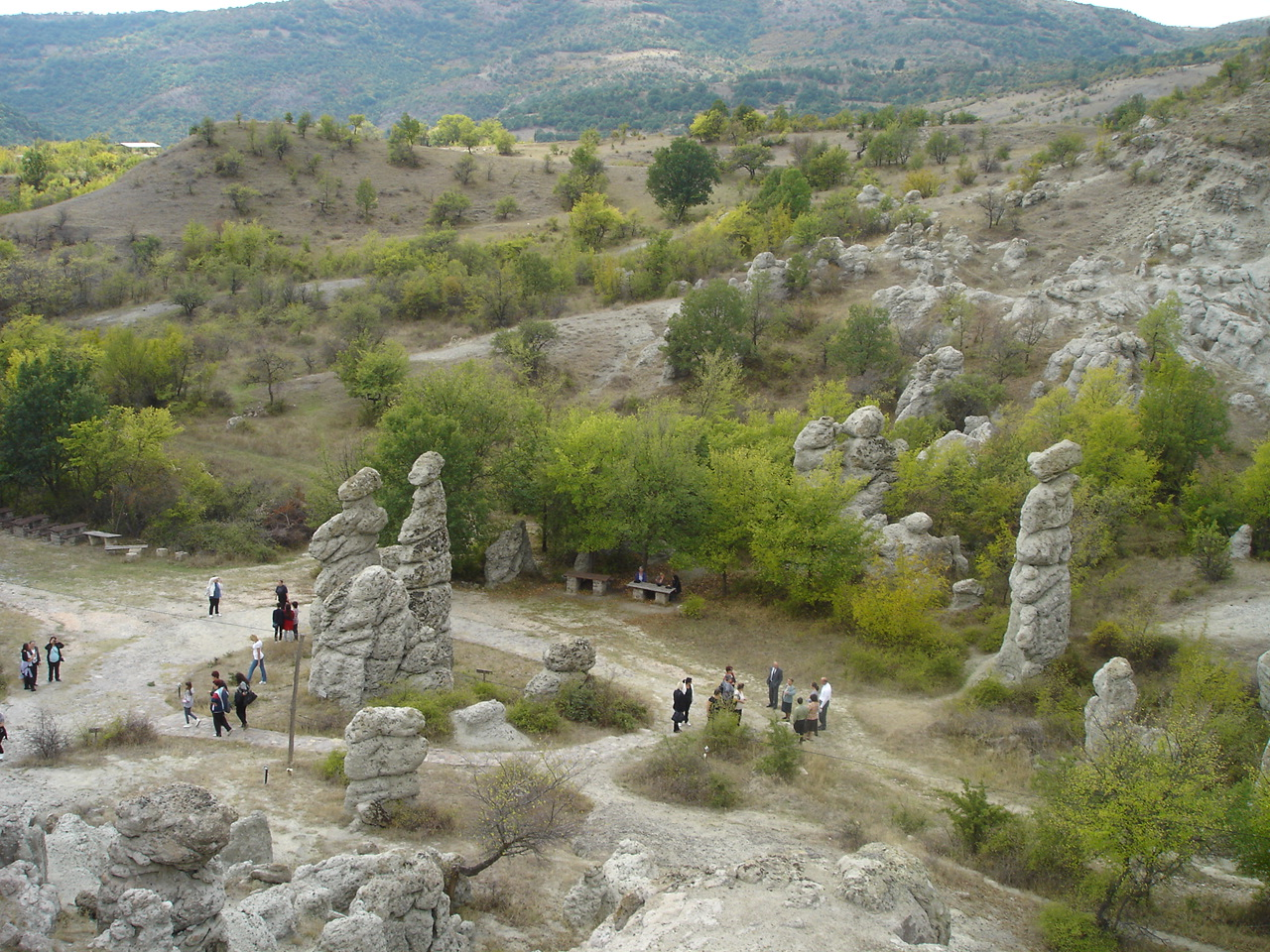
The site of the "Stone wedding" in Kuklica

== Legends ==
There are two main legends surrounding the formation of the strange stone pillars in Kuklica. The most famous legend is that of a man who could not decide which of two women he should marry. So, the man planned to marry each woman on the same day at different times. When the first wedding was in progress, the woman to marry the man second went to see who was getting married on the same day as she. When she saw her future husband marrying another woman, she cursed all in attendance at the wedding and turned them into stone.

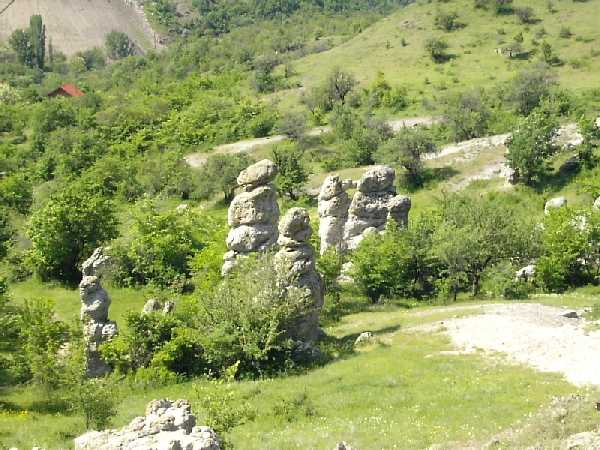
Stone pillars

Another popular legend is that there was once a forest in the area, but due to battles it was burned down. Then, the area became a wasteland. The temperatures were very low and when the army passed through the wasteland, all of the soldiers turned into rocks.

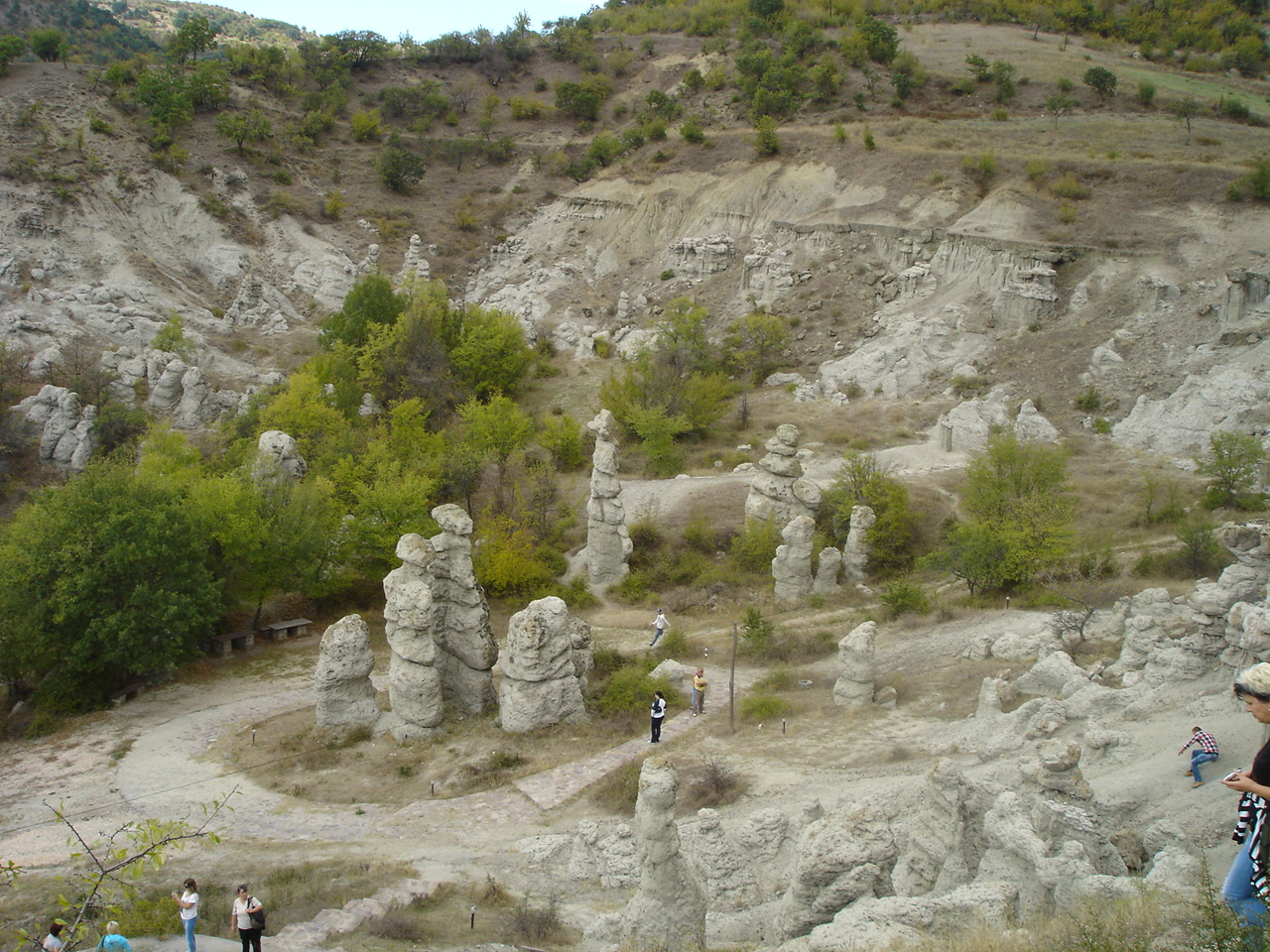
Panoramic view of the site

According to the local villagers, new figures appear every 5–6 years. There are four places in the Balkans where this phenomenon can be seen, three of which are in North Macedonia.

== Formation ==
Aside from mystic stories and legends, the earth pyramid in Kuklica was formed as a result of natural erosion processes in the Holocene, during the past 100,000 years. Differences in the erodibility of the volcanic rocks of the area are the main factor for the pillars creation. Thus, soft tuffs rocks on the base are overlaid by solid, sturdy andesites and ignimbrites on the top, which are nearly 30 million years old.

== See also ==
- Geology of North Macedonia
- Kuklica
- Kratovo
- Hoodoo (geology)
