= Tilasite =

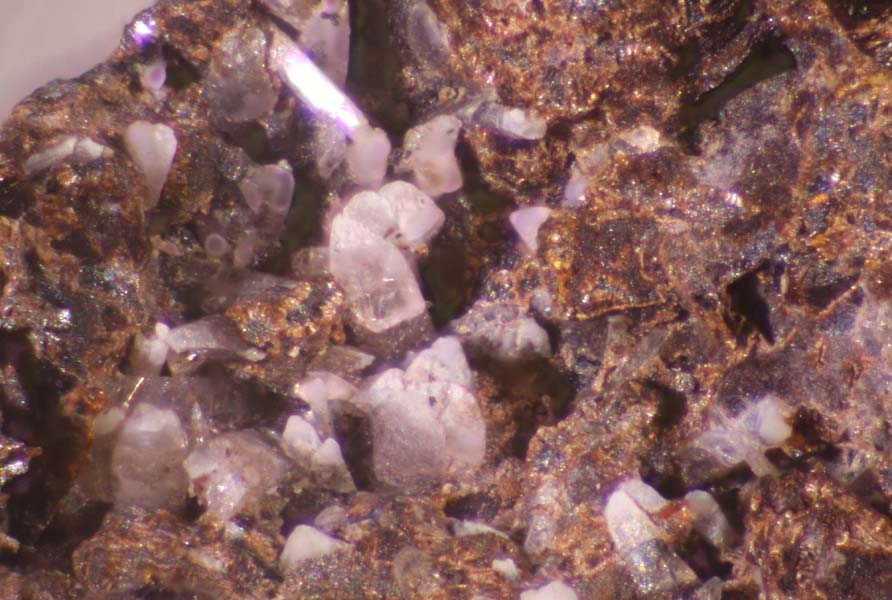
- Grischunite and Tilasite: Well formed orange brown grischunite crystals associated to almost white tilasite crystals. From: Falotta, Tinzen, Grischun, Switzerland

General
- Category: Minerals
- Formula: CaMg(AsO4)F
- IMA symbol: Til
- Strunz classification: 8.BH.10
- Dana classification: 41.5.6.1
- Crystal system: Monoclinic
- Unit cell: a = 6.681 Å, b = 8.950 Å, c = 7.573 Å β = 121.14°

Structure

Identification
- Formula mass: 222.30
- Mohs scale hardness: 5
- Diaphaneity: Translucent
- Specific gravity: 3.75 - 3.79
- Optical properties: Biaxial (-)
- Refractive index: nα = 1.640 nβ = 1.660 nγ = 1.675
- Birefringence: 0.035
- 2V angle: 83°
- Dispersion: relatively weak

Tilasite is an arsenate mineral gemstone, with the elemental formula CaMg(AsO_{4})F. It prefers the monoclinic form of crystal, and has Mohs hardness of 5. It was named in 1895 by Hjalmar Sjögren in honor of Daniel Tilas, who was once director of mines for Sweden, and a regional governor for Västmanland. It was first discovered in Langban, Varmland.

In 1972, Bladh et al. characterised samples found near Bisbee, Arizona.

In 1994, Bermanec discovered centro-symmetric Tilasite near Nezhilovo, North Macedonia.
