= Ferrogedrite =

Amphibole, double chain inosilicate mineral

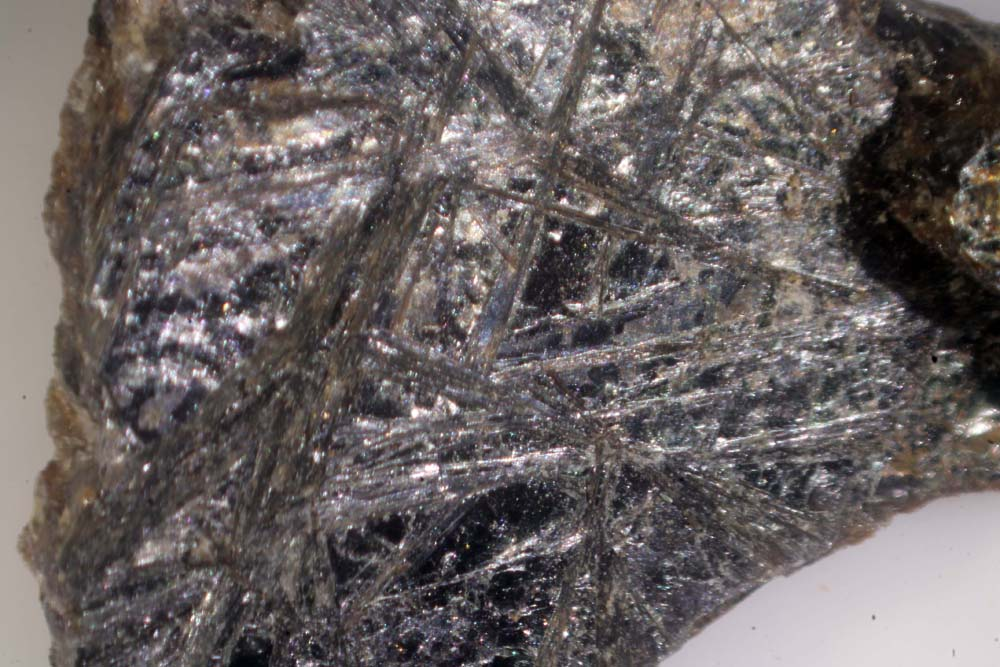
- Needles of ferro-gedrite on cleavage plane (001) of sekaninaite.

General
- Category: Inosilicates; Amphibole
- Formula: ☐Fe^{2+}_{2}(Fe^{2+}_{3}Al_{2})(Si_{6}Al_{2})O_{22}(OH)_{2}
- Strunz classification: 9.DD.05
- Crystal system: Orthorhombic
- Crystal class: Dipyramidal (mmm); H-M symbol: (2/m 2/m 2/m)
- Space group: Pnma
- Unit cell: a = 18.52 Å, b = 17.94 Å, c = 5.31 Å; Z = 4

Identification
- Color: Pale greenish-gray to brown
- Crystal habit: Crystals prismatic to bladed; fibrous
- Cleavage: Perfect on {210}, with 54° and 126° intersections
- Tenacity: Brittle
- Mohs scale hardness: 5.5–6
- Luster: Vitreous
- Streak: Gray white
- Diaphaneity: Transparent to translucent
- Specific gravity: 3.566
- Optical properties: Biaxial (-)
- Refractive index: n_{α} = 1.642 - 1.694 n_{β} = 1.649 - 1.710 n_{γ} = 1.661 - 1.722
- Birefringence: δ = 0.019 - 0.028
- Pleochroism: X = pale green; Y = brownish green; Z = greenish blue
- 2V angle: Measured: 82°
- Dispersion: r < v

Ferrogedrite is an amphibole mineral with the complex chemical formula of ☐Fe^{2+}_{2}(Fe^{2+}_{3}Al_{2})(Si_{6}Al_{2})O_{22}(OH)_{2}. It is sodium and calcium poor, making it part of the magnesium-iron-manganese-lithium amphibole subgroup. Defined as less than 1.00 apfu (atoms per formula unit) of Na + Ca and consisting of greater than 1.00 apfu of (Mg, Fe^{2+}, Mn^{2+}, Li) separating it from the calcic-sodic amphiboles. It is related to anthophyllite amphibole and gedrite through coupled substitution of (Al, Fe^{3+}) for (Mg, Fe^{2+}, Mn) and Al for Si. and determined by the content of silicon in the standard cell.

== Occurrence ==
Specimens of ferrogedrite have been collected in the greenstone belt of Africa, in the mountains of Norway, Greenland, Japan and in amphibole specimens from northwest America as well as the southern coast of California. Ferrogedrite exists in low temperature, high pressure contact metamorphic geologic settings and remain stable up to 600 °C-800 °C due to its iron content.

== Structure ==
As an end member of its subgroup due to its aluminium content in the octahedral site, is sensitive to high pressures. The M4 site is the most important for classification housing the largest cation and causing behavior similar to monoclinic amphiboles. The linear relationship between the radius of M4 cations and the grand mean radius is varied and dependent on the M1, M2, and M3 sites inferring reliance on aluminium. The maximum content of aluminium in Ferrogedrite is 1.47 in the octahedral site. A low-temperature solvus in the mineral causes exsolution changing the chemistry of a specimen resulting in confusing variations and close peaks in the diffraction pattern due to overlapping of phases.

Ferrogedrite is an orthorhombic dipyramidal amphibole with an H-M symbol of 2/m 2/m 2/m, and its space group is Pnma. Cleavage is {110} perfect, {010} indistinct, and {110} indistinct with angles not at 90 degrees. Created by distinct events, exsolution during cooling suggests its structure can be in asbestos form.

This is a hydrous mineral that will exsolve and form course, elongated laths (230–1070 mm, or fine fibrous (10–70 mm). This double chain inosilicate with two unequal double-chains of tetrahedral the A and B chains. The Fe^{2+} are smaller cations in the M4 site than monoclinic amphiboles rich in Na and Ca and results in weakness under pressure. The higher Al content of the mineral strengthens the mineral as it increases the size of the tetrahedral and its placement in the M2 site. The rigidity of Al in the mineral counteracts the compressional weakness of the Fe^{2+} in high temperature and pressure environments. It is believed the edge-sharing ribbon of octahedra provides the strength and resistance to the structure.

== Properties ==
Ferrogedrite is identified optically by its distinct cleavage and twinning with angles wider (650 and 1330) than its counterparts, its dark-green to brown rims. and minor matrix. The hardness of ferrogedrite registers between 5.5-5.6 on the Mohs hardness scale and will scratch a knife blade and leaves a gray white streak on a ceramic plate. Ferrogedrite in its fibrous state, along with other amphiboles is considered due to medium-grade conditions. Found initially by Seki and Yamasaki in 1957 in Japan and approved by the IMA in 1978. It is often found as an inclusion in garnet crystals.
