= Kuklica =

Kuklica Куклица
- Village
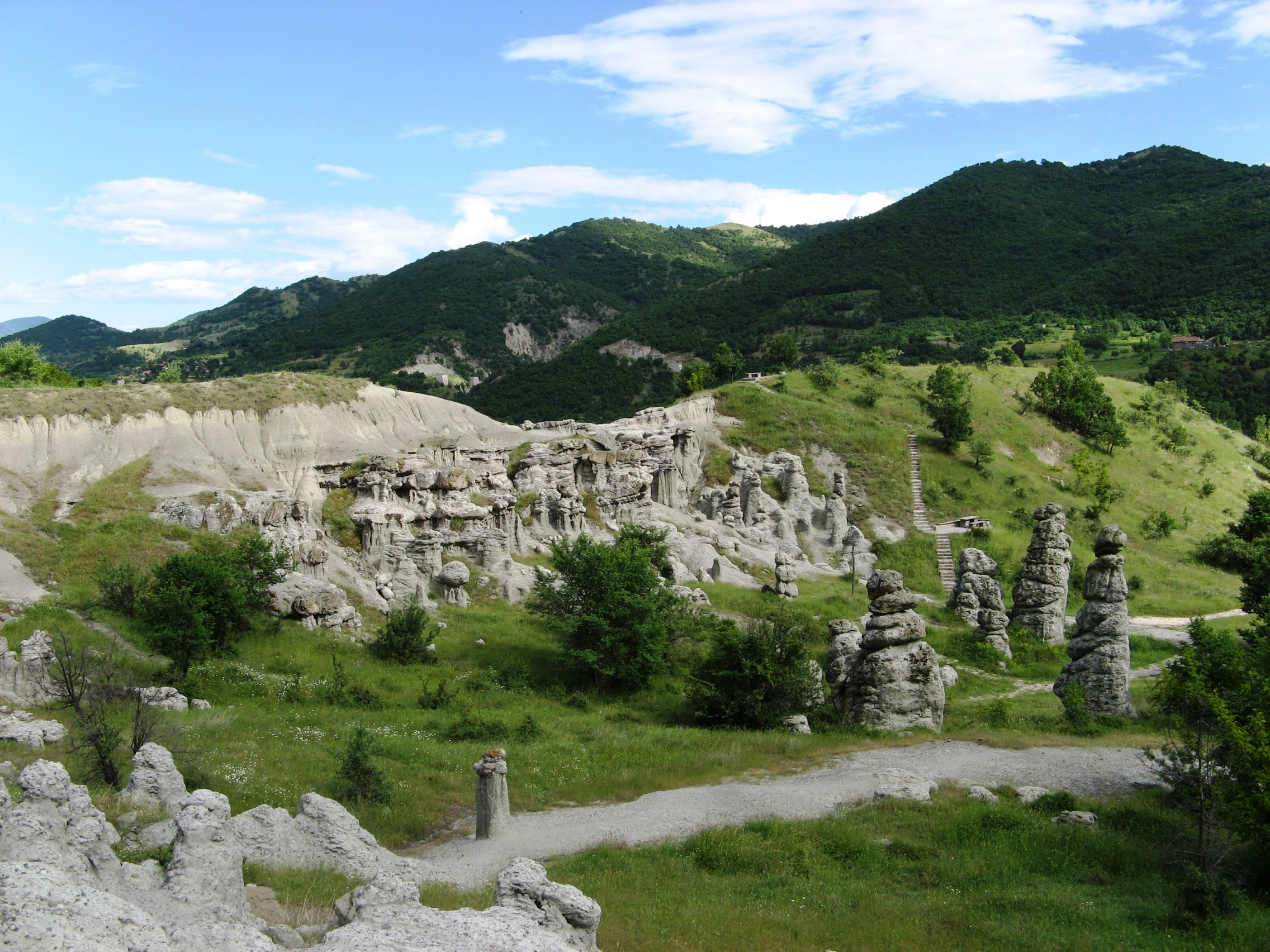
- Stone pillars in Kuklica

- Location within North Macedonia
- Country: North Macedonia
- Region: Northeastern
- Municipality: Kratovo

Population (2002)
  - Total: 97
- Time zone: UTC+1 (CET)
  - Summer (DST): UTC+2 (CEST)
- Website: .

Kuklica (Macedonian: Куклица) is a small village in the municipality of Kratovo, North Macedonia. It is known for the hundreds of naturally formed stone pillars that resemble humans. The village has about 100 inhabitants.

== Geographic location ==
Kuklica is located 8 km (5 mi) northwest from Kratovo. It is known by natural phenomena of characteristic erosive landforms called earth pyramids, earth pillars or stone dolls. These landforms are found on the right side of Kriva River valley, at the 415–420 m (1,362–1,378 ft) above sea level, and extend over an area of 0.3 square kilometres (0.12 sq mi).

== Demographics ==
According to the 2002 census, the village had a total of 97 inhabitants. Ethnic groups in the village include:

- Macedonians 97

== See also ==
- Stone town of Kuklica
