= Bogomila Falls =

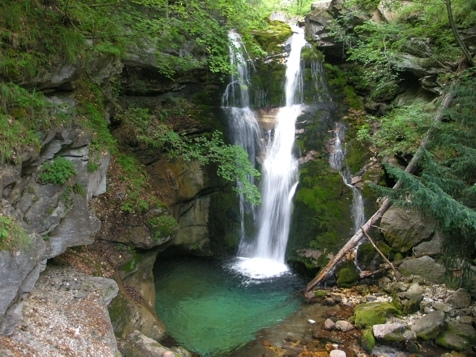
Bogomila Falls near the springs of the Babuna River

Bogomila Falls, better known as Babuna Falls are waterfalls located north of the village of Bogomila in the Municipality of Čaška in North Macedonia. Bogomila Falls is formed by the Babuna River where it springs below the eastern face of Solunska Glava.

== See also ==
- List of waterfalls
