= Clintonite =

Phyllosilicate mineral in the brittle mica group

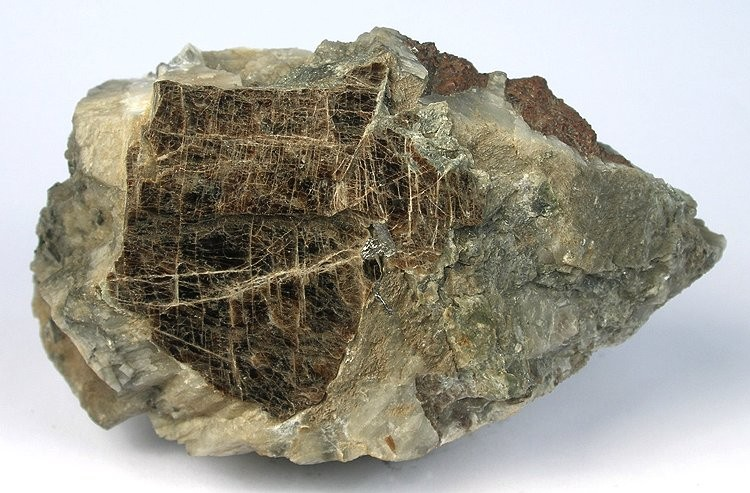
- Clintonite with spinel on orthoclase matrix from Amity, New York (size: 9.3 × 5.7 × 3.8 cm)

General
- Category: Phyllosilicate minerals
- Group: Mica group, brittle mica group
- Formula: Ca(Mg,Al)_{3}(Al_{3}Si)O_{10}(OH)_{2}
- IMA symbol: Cln
- Crystal system: Monoclinic
- Crystal class: Prismatic (2/m) or domatic (m)
- Space group: C2/m or (?)
- Unit cell: a = 5.204 Å, b = 9.026 Å, c = 9.812 Å; β = 100.35°; Z = 2

Identification
- Color: Colorless, yellow, orange, red-brown, brown, green
- Crystal habit: Tabular pseudohexagonal crystals; foliated or lamellar radiated; massive
- Twinning: Spiral polysynthetic twinning
- Cleavage: Perfect on {001}
- Tenacity: Brittle
- Mohs scale hardness: 3.5 on {001}, 6 at angle to {001}
- Luster: Vitreous, pearly, submetallic
- Streak: White, slightly yellow-gray
- Diaphaneity: Transparent to translucent
- Specific gravity: 3.0–3.1
- Optical properties: Biaxial (−)
- Refractive index: n_{α} = 1.643 – 1.648 n_{β} = 1.655 – 1.662 n_{γ} = 1.655 – 1.663
- Birefringence: δ = 0.012 – 0.015
- Pleochroism: X = colorless, pale orange, red-brown; Y = Z = pale brownish yellow, pale green
- 2V angle: Measured: 2° to 40°

Clintonite is a calcium magnesium aluminium phyllosilicate mineral. It is a member of the margarite group of micas and the subgroup often referred to as the "brittle" micas. Clintonite has the chemical formula Ca(Mg,Al)_{3}(Al_{3}Si)O_{10}(OH)_{2}. Like other micas and chlorites, clintonite is monoclinic in crystal form and has a perfect basal cleavage parallel to the flat surface of the plates or scales. The Mohs hardness of clintonite is 6.5, and the specific gravity is 3.0 to 3.1. It occurs as variably colored, colorless, green, yellow, red, to reddish-brown masses and radial clusters.

The brittle micas differ chemically from the micas in containing less silica and no alkalis, and from the chlorites in containing much less water; in many respects, they are intermediate between the micas and chlorites. Clintonite and its iron-rich variety xanthophyllite are sometimes considered the calcium analogues of the phlogopites.

Typical formation environment is in serpentinized dolomitic limestone and contact metamorphosed skarns. It occurs with talc, spinel, grossular, vesuvianite, clinopyroxene, monticellite, chondrodite, phlogopite, chlorite, quartz, calcite and dolomite.

Clintonite was first described in 1843 for an occurrence in Orange County, New York. It was named for De Witt Clinton (1769–1828).

== See also ==
- List of minerals
- List of minerals named after people
