= Hollandite =

Barium manganese oxide mineral

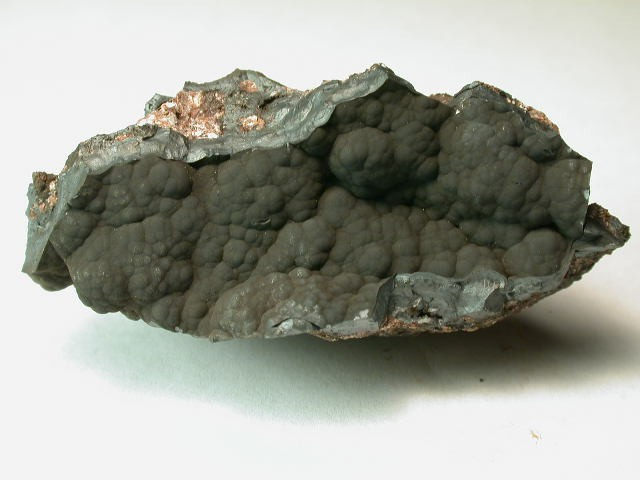

General
- Category: Oxide minerals
- Formula: Ba(Mn^{4+}_{6}Mn^{3+}_{2})O_{16}
- IMA symbol: Hol
- Strunz classification: 4.DK.05a
- Dana classification: 7.9.1.1
- Crystal system: Monoclinic
- Crystal class: Prismatic (2/m)
- Space group: Monoclinic; H-M symbol: (2/m); Space group: I2/m

Identification
- Color: Silvery-grey to greyish
- Cleavage: Distinct / Good, Prismatic
- Mohs scale hardness: 4 to 6
- Density: 4.95

Hollandite (chemical formula: Ba(Mn^{4+}_{6}Mn^{3+}_{2})O_{16}) is a manganese oxide mineral. Its structure consists of double chains of MnO_{6} octahedra delimiting 2 × 2 tunnels. The electrostatic charge created by the Mn^{3+} for Mn^{4+} substitution is balanced by cations in the tunnels. Their nature determines the mineral species: Ba for hollandite, K for cryptomelane, Pb for coronadite, Sr for strontiomelane, Tl for thalliomelane, and Na for manjiroite. Pure species are rare and most 2 × 2 tectomanganates contain mixtures of several types of tunnel cations.

A mineral, with the chemical composition BaMn^{4+}_{6}Fe^{3+}_{2}O_{16}, that was first found in the Kajlidongri mine in the Jhabua district of Madhya Pradesh, India, had the name hollandite until it was reclassified as ferrihollandite by the International Mineralogical Association in 2012. Ferrihollandite is the barium-iron (III) endmember of the coronadite group.

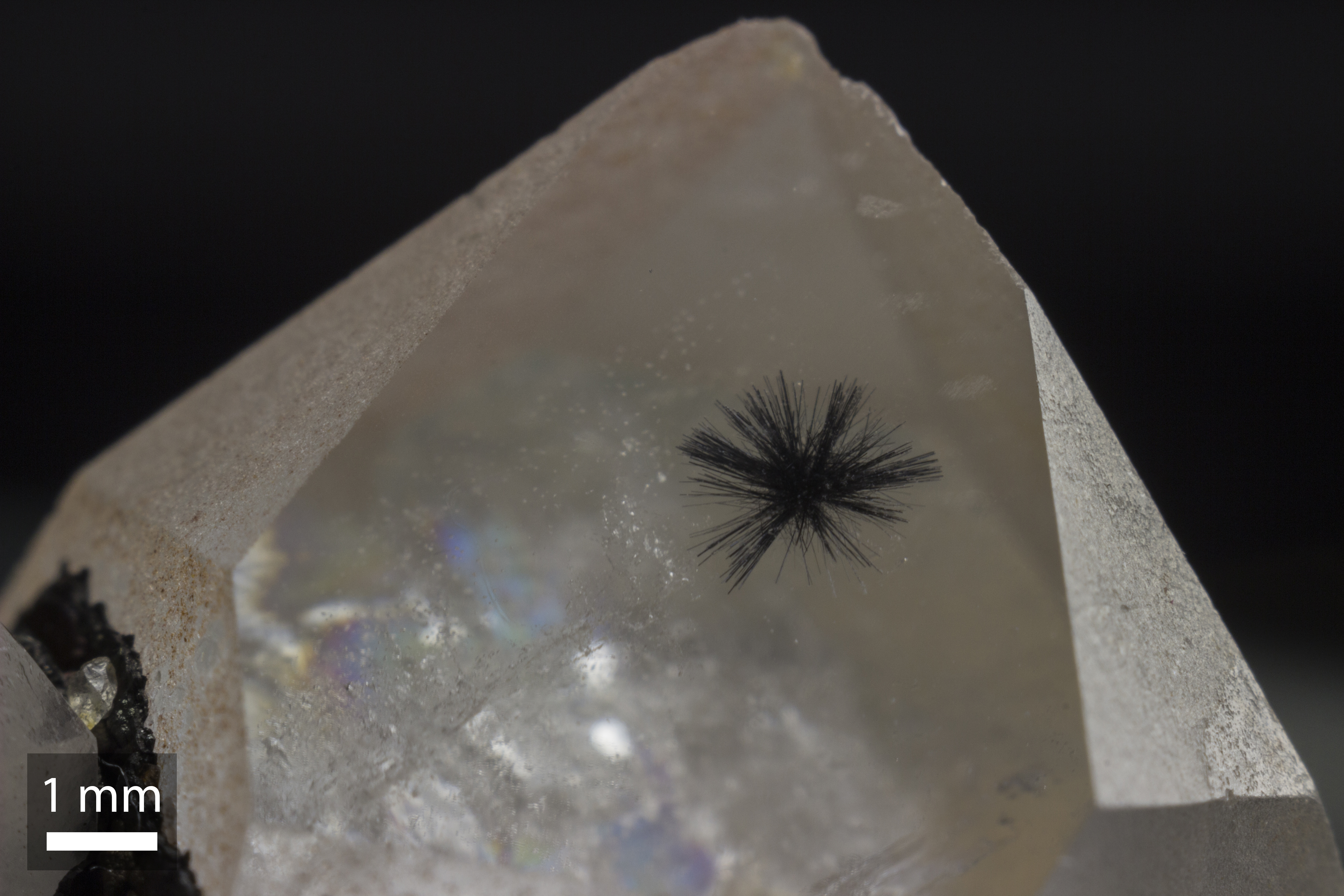
Hollandite star in rare quartz inclusion
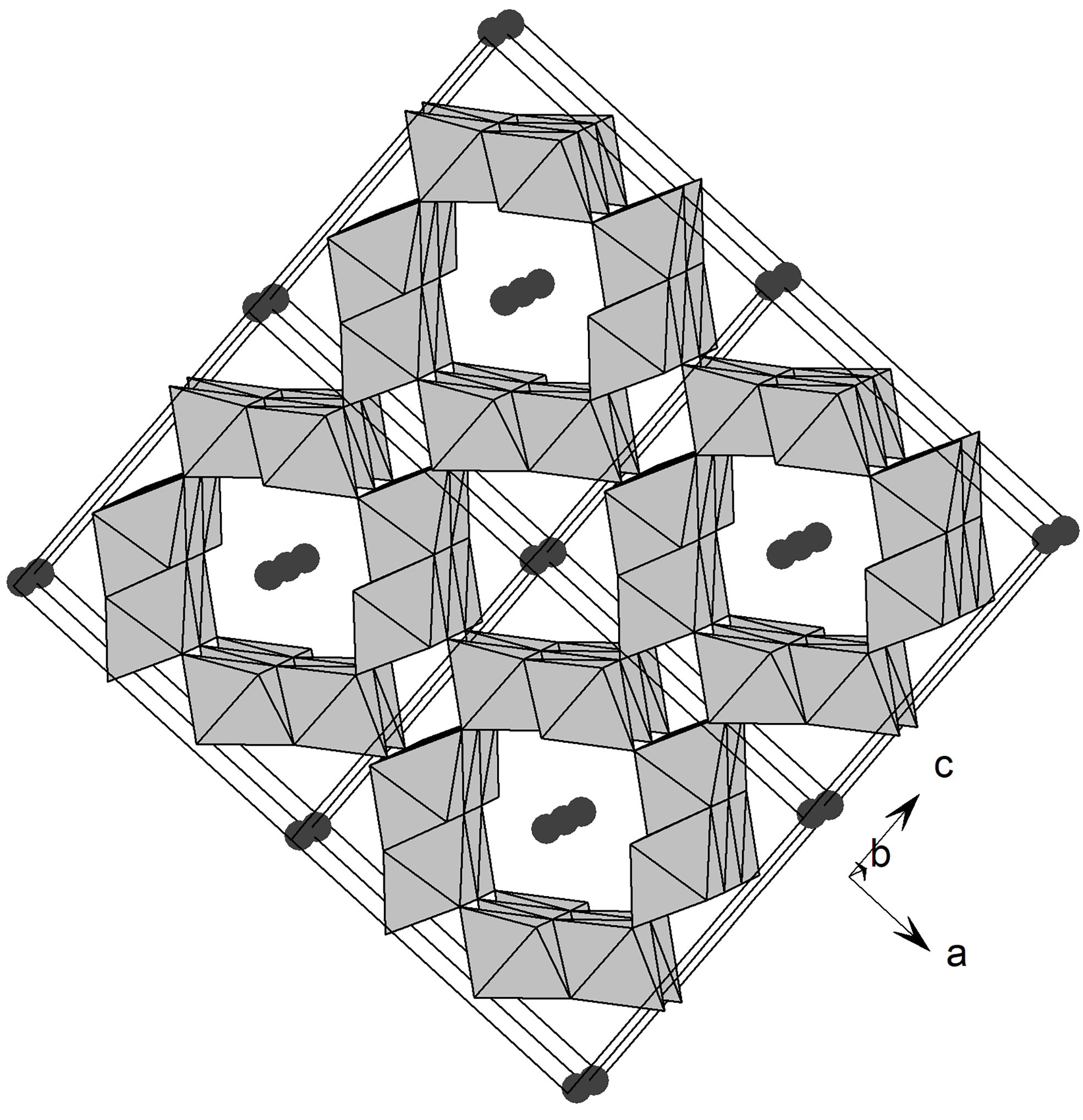
Polyhedral representation of the 2 × 2 tunnel structure of hollandite. The black atoms represent Ba.

== See also ==
- Manganese dioxide
