= Stone river =

Stone River, are a Canadian Classic rock band.

== History ==
Stone River was formed in 2004 shortly after high-school friends Jeff Desilets and Darren Flower met Renan Yildizdogan. Tommy Brown and Jay Macedo would join the group soon after. The band has played over 100 shows across Ontario. During the past 3 years they have gained fans from all ages and backgrounds along the way. In 2005 these ambitious rockers, in their early 20’s, hired producer Tom Treumuth (Big Sugar, Honeymoon Suite, Helix) to produce their first full-length album. The album taking almost 2 years to complete, reflects the bands care and dedication to detail when it comes to their music. Soon after Jay Macedo joined the band, Scott Larocque left the band during the recording of their debut record to pursue a career at Sleep Country Canada leaving the band without a drummer. Tommy Brown is the current drummer of Stone River.

In 2008, Stone River has played in direct support of major acts like The Black Crowes and Jeff Martin. With the rising success of their debut LP, The Valley Of The Butterflies, Stone River released their debut record in Europe in October 2009. While not totally retro, the band’s music has the tight harmonies and musical depth of early 70’s Rock while containing a variety of influences from Folk to Metal. "This isn’t pre-packaged pop or sound-alike grunge for the masses. It’s real Rock, for people who love Rock’N Roll."

== Discography ==
- The Valley of the Butterflies (2008, Gypsy Soul/Fallen Sky/E1)

== Singles ==
- "Southern Feeling"
- "Cold Black River"
- "Can't Help Loving Her"
