= Babuna (river) =

River in North Macedonia

Coordinates: 41°38′59.0″N 21°44′19.9″E

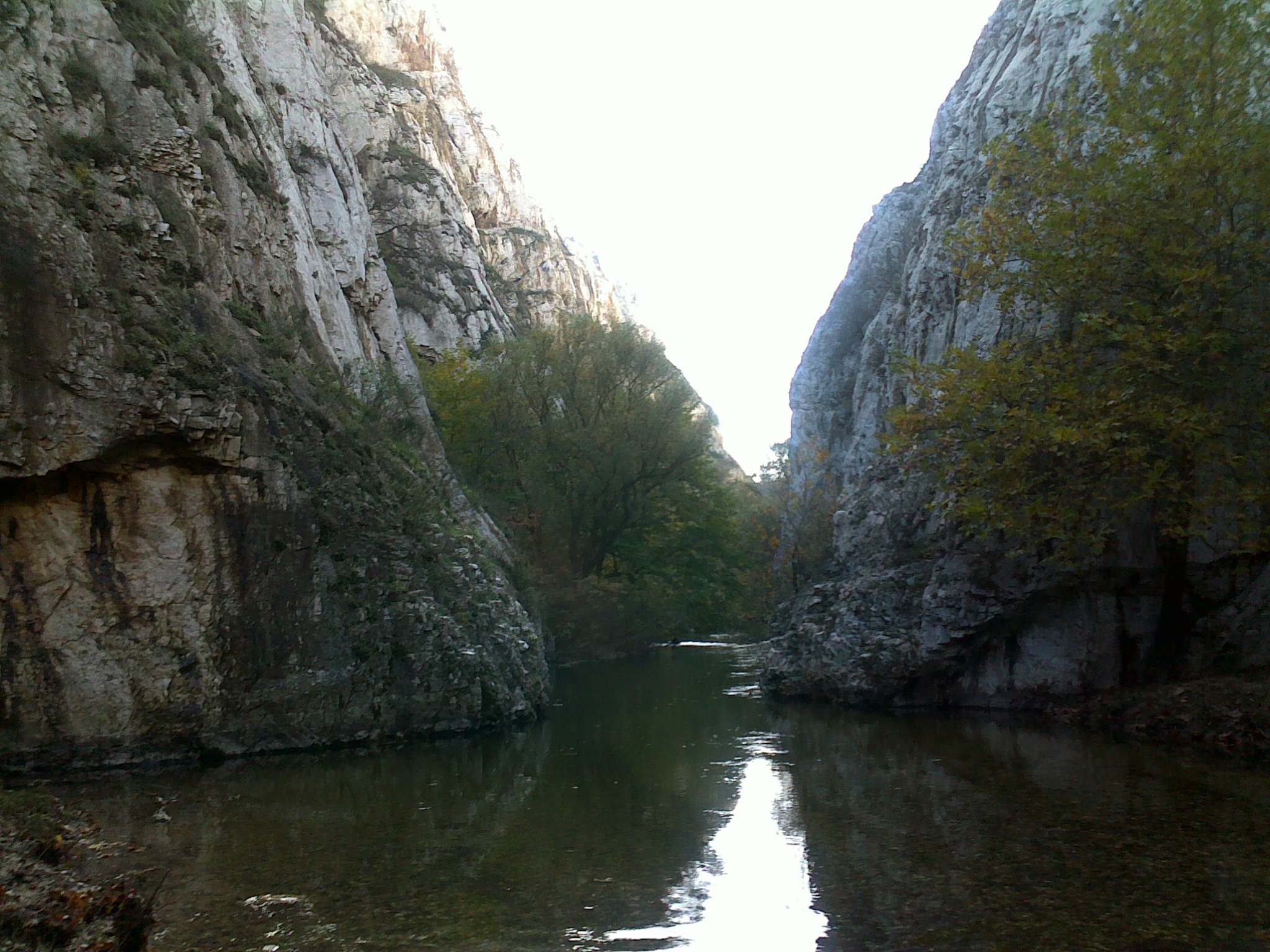
Babuna

The Babuna River (in Macedonian: Бабуна река) in North Macedonia is a right tributary of the Vardar. It collects water from sink holes on Begovo Pole and flows from the southern flank of the Jakupica range. It is alimented by the Kamen Lednik glacier through the Bogomila Falls, just north of Nezhilovo village.
