= Sivec =

Type of marble

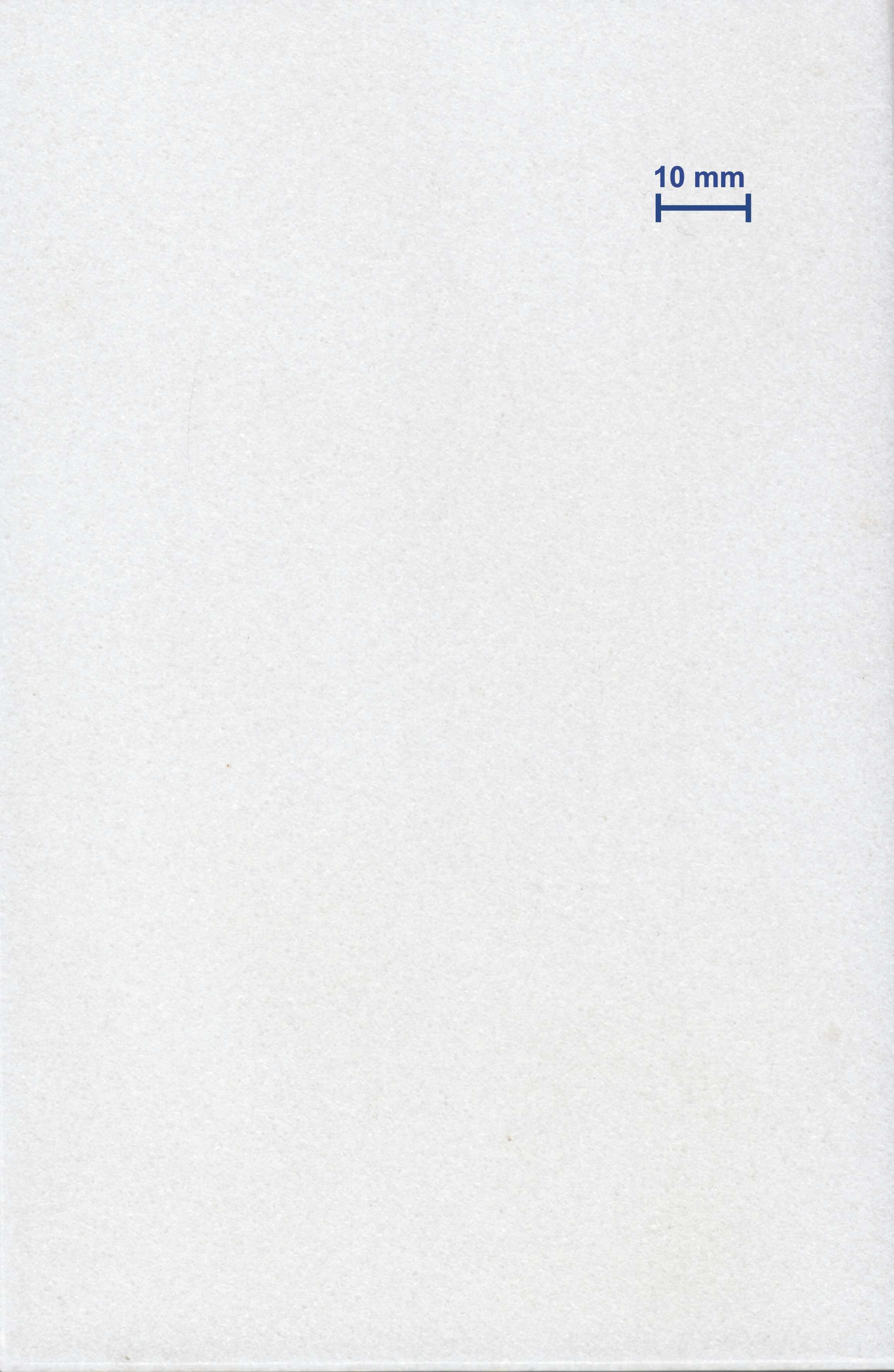
Sivec marble

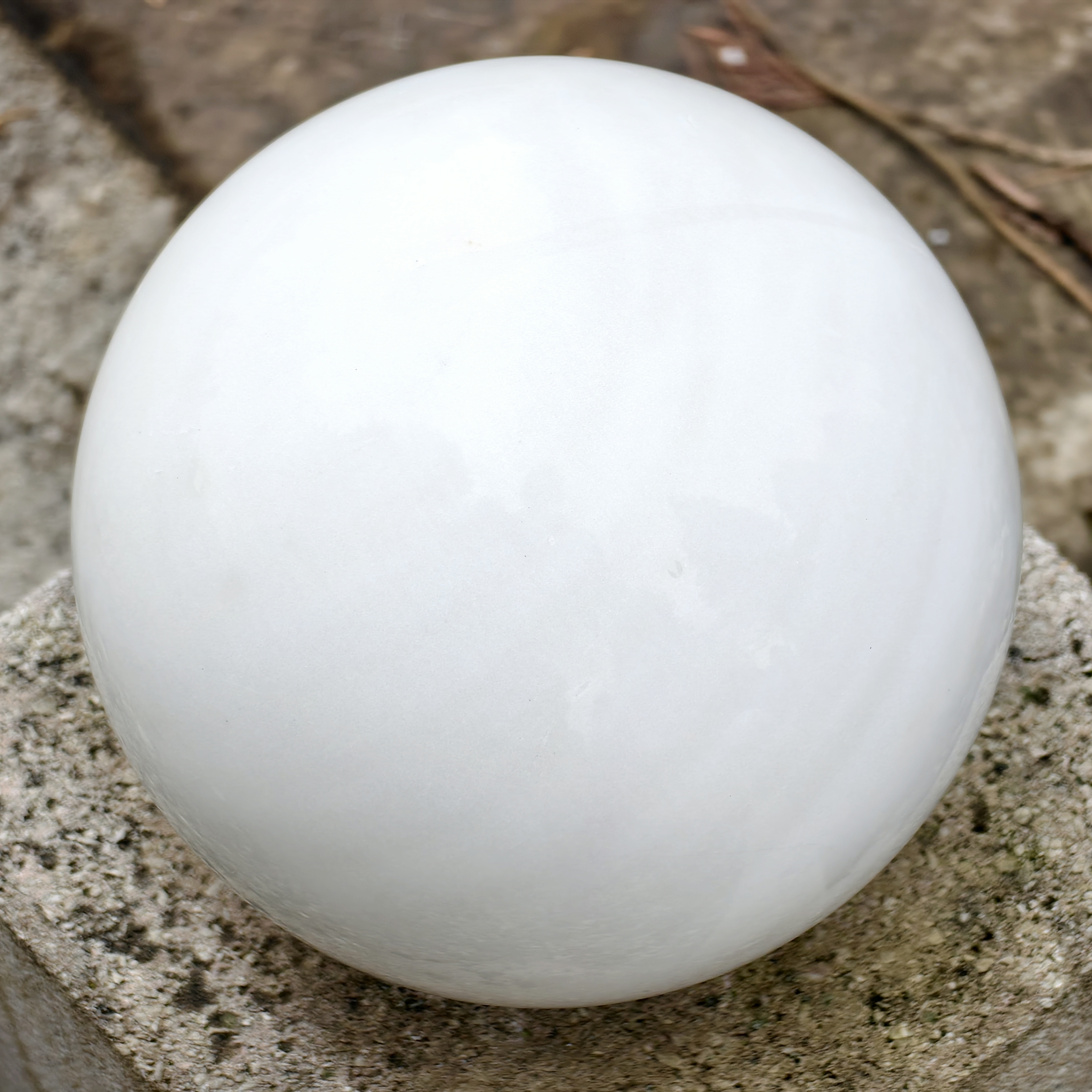
Utilisation of the Sivec marble as sphere

Sivec is the trademark of the dolomitic marble extracted from the quarries of Mermeren Kombinat A.D., near the town of Prilep in North Macedonia. The fine grain makes it ideal for sculpture and architectural applications.

== History ==
The extraction of Sivec marble can be dated back 500 BCE and earlier. Extraction flourished under the Roman period when the quarries near the ancient city of Stibera (today Prilep) produced stone for the production of Roman sculptures, as well as replicas of Greek original bronzes. These replicas went to Rome or to other parts of the empire.

Sivec is a renowned material that was extensively utilized in southeastern Europe from the 3rd century BCE until the 5th century CE, giving rise to some of the most visually breathtaking creations of the ancient world. It is estimated that approximately 1.2 million cubic meters of Sivec White Marble were extracted from the Prilep area during this period.

Through the centuries, Sivec was used for many building and reconstruction sites throughout the world. It was used for the reconstruction of Roman emperor Diocletian's Palace in Split, Croatia. It has been also used by Edvard Ravnikar for lines at Prešeren Square in Ljubljana, Slovenia. Also, all of the marble used in the external cladding of the Sheikh Zayed Grand Mosque was sourced from Sivec.

== Today ==
The marble-bearing deposits in the area are widely known and are among the largest in the world. The whiteness of the marble, its homogeneous form, and the micro-granular structure generate a high demand for Sivec marble on the international market.

Sivec®, or Bianco Sivec, is the registered name for this fine-grained white dolomitic marble.

Nowadays, Sivec has been selected to give the characteristic, exclusive white appearance in many large well-known projects including hotels, palaces, commercial buildings, etc.

== Company ==
A quarry was established in 1946. In 2009, NBGI Private Equity and Ethemba Capital acquired 88.4% of the shares of the company through Stone Works Holdings, a Dutch company co-owned by private equity funds managed by NBGI Private Equity and Ethemba Capital. In 2017 Pavlidis Marble Granite, one of the largest sellers of white marble, purchased the Stone Works Holdings, which owns 89.25% of Mermeren Kombinat A.D.

== See also ==
- List of types of marble
