= Nezhilovo =

Nezhilovo Нежилово
- Village
- Location within Ivanovo Oblast Location within Russia
- Coordinates: 56°54′N 41°05′E
- Country: Russia
- Region: Ivanovo Oblast
- District: Ivanovsky District
- Time zone: UTC+3:00

Nezhilovo (Russian: Нежилово) is a rural locality (a village) in Ivanovsky District, Ivanovo Oblast, Russia. Population: 12 (2010 census); 8 (2002 census);

== Geography ==
This rural locality is located 12 km from Ivanovo (the district's administrative centre and capital of Ivanovo Oblast) and 247 km from Moscow. Timoshkino is the nearest rural locality.
