= Margarite =

Phyllosilicate mineral in the brittle mica group

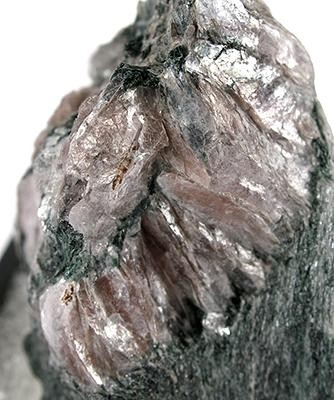
- Margarite from the Wright Mine, Chester Emery Mines, Chester, Hampden County, Massachusetts, USA. Size: 4.8 x 3.4 x 2.6 cm.

General
- Category: Phyllosilicate minerals
- Group: Mica group, brittle mica group
- Formula: CaAl_{2}(Al_{2}Si_{2})O_{10}(OH)_{2}
- IMA symbol: Mrg
- Strunz classification: 9.EC.30
- Crystal system: Monoclinic
- Crystal class: Domatic (m) (same H-M symbol)
- Space group: Cc

Identification
- Color: flesh pink
- Crystal habit: platy
- Cleavage: basal
- Mohs scale hardness: 4

Margarite is a calcium rich member of the mica group of the phyllosilicates with formula: CaAl_{2}(Al_{2}Si_{2})O_{10}(OH)_{2}. It forms white to pinkish or yellowish gray masses or thin laminae. It crystallizes in the monoclinic crystal system. It typically has a specific gravity of around 3 and a Mohs hardness of 4. It is translucent with perfect 010 cleavage and exhibits crystal twinning.

It occurs commonly as an alteration product of corundum, andalusite and other aluminous minerals. It has been reported as forming alteration pseudomorphs of chiastolite along with muscovite and paragonite. The margarite in this occurrence forms preferentially along the dark graphite rich inclusions with the chiastolite crystals.

Margarite is found in the emery deposits of Turkey and the Aegean islands, and with corundum at several localities in the United States.
