= Asbestiform =

Type of crystal habit

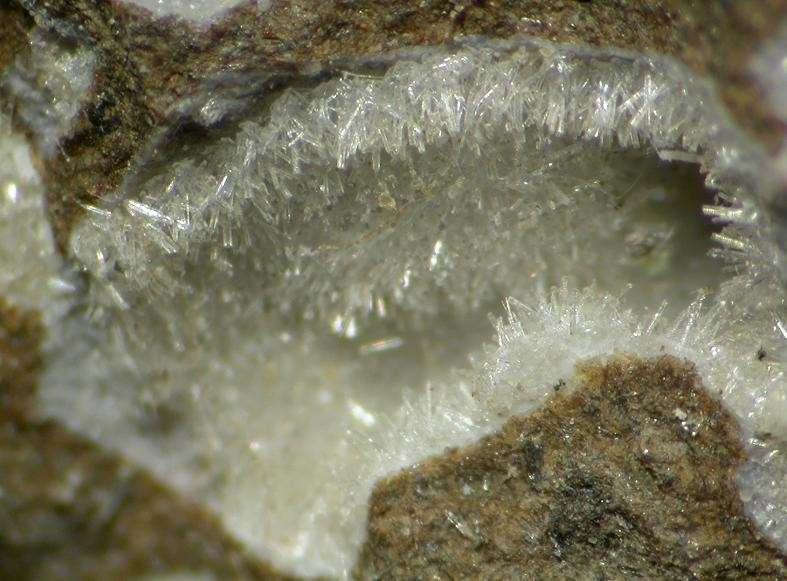
Fibrous Erionite in asbestiform

Asbestiform is a crystal habit. It describes a mineral that grows in a fibrous aggregate of high tensile strength, flexible, long, and thin crystals that readily separate. The most common asbestiform mineral is chrysotile, commonly called "white asbestos", a magnesium phyllosilicate part of the serpentine group. Erionite, part of the zeolite group is found in asbestiform habit and is highly carcinogenic. Other asbestiform minerals include the zeolite mordenite, riebeckite, an amphibole whose fibrous form is known as crocidolite or "blue asbestos", and amosite, a cummingtonite-grunerite solid solution series. Another Zeolite that has come to light recently that is asbestiform is fibrous ferrierite.

The United States Environmental Protection Agency explains that, "In general, exposure may occur only when the asbestos-containing material is disturbed or damaged in some way to release particles and fibers into the air."

"Mountain leather" is an old-fashioned term for flexible, sheet-like natural formations of asbestiform minerals which resemble leather. Asbestos-containing minerals known to form mountain leather include: actinolite, palygorskite, saponite, sepiolite, tremolite, and zeolite.

=== List of asbesitform minerals ===
The following are known asbestiform minerals:
(this is not a complete list)

- chrysotile††
- tremolite††
- actinolite††
- anthophyllite††
- amosite††
- crocidolite††
- erionite†
- winchite†
- fluoro-edenite†
- palygorskite‡
- saponite¹
- ferrierite¹
- mesolite¹
- mordenite¹
- sepiolite¹
- natrolite¹
- offretite¹
- thomsonite¹
- stilbite¹
- carlosturanite¹
- brucite¹
- scolecite¹

symbols:
††: asbestos minerals (IARC group 1) (proven carcingogens)
†: proven carcinogens (IARC group 1). (Non-asbestos mineral)
‡: possibly carcinogen: (IARC group 2B)
¹: not classifiable carcinogen: (IARC group 3): Possibly carcinogenic but more studies are needed.

references:,,,,,,

== See also ==
- Chrysotile
- Erionite
