= Gedrite =

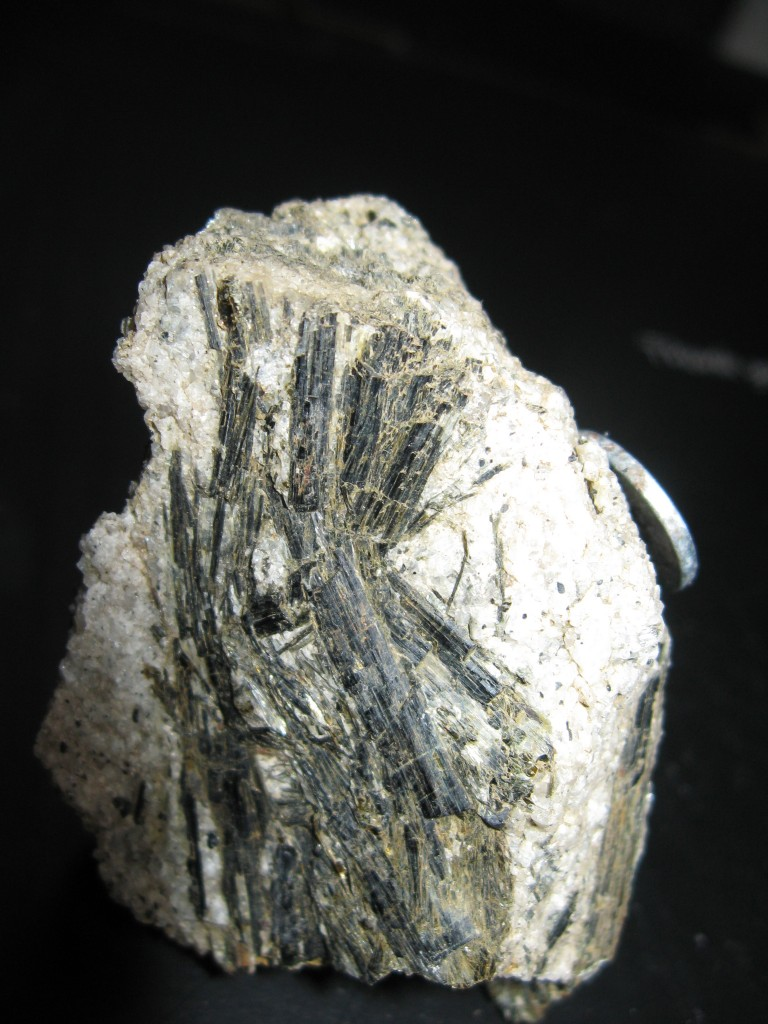
- Gedrite on a feldspar matrix

General
- Category: Inosilicate, ferromagnesian amphibole group
- Formula: Mg_{2}(Mg_{3}Al_{2})(Si_{6}Al_{2})O_{22}(OH)_{2}
- IMA symbol: Ged
- Strunz classification: 9.DD.05
- Crystal system: Orthorhombic
- Crystal class: Dipyramidal (mmm); H-M symbol: (2/m 2/m 2/m)
- Space group: Pnma
- Unit cell: a = 18.59, b = 17.89 c = 5.3 [Å]; Z = 4

Identification
- Color: White, gray, brown, green, black
- Crystal habit: Bladed and prismatic crystals; fibrous and sheath like aggregates.
- Twinning: contact twinning
- Cleavage: 56 and 126° – good; {210} perfect
- Fracture: Splintery
- Mohs scale hardness: 5.5–6
- Luster: Vitreous to silky
- Diaphaneity: Translucent, will transmit light on thin edges.
- Specific gravity: 3.18–3.33
- Optical properties: Biaxial (+)
- Refractive index: n_{α} = 1.671 n_{β} = 1.681 n_{γ} = 1.690
- Birefringence: δ = 0.019
- Pleochroism: Weak to moderate
- 2V angle: Measured: 75°

Gedrite is a crystal belonging to the orthorhombic ferromagnesian subgroup of the amphibole supergroup of the double chain inosilicate minerals with the ideal chemical formula Mg_{2}(Mg_{3}Al_{2})(Si_{6}Al_{2})O_{22}(OH)_{2}.

Gedrite is the magnesium (Mg) rich endmember of a solid solution series, with divalent magnesium cations readily replaced with ferrous iron (Fe), leading to the iron rich endmember 'ferrogedrite', with the formula: Fe^{2+}_{2}(Fe^{2+}_{3}Al_{2})(Si_{6}Al_{2})O_{22}(OH)_{2}. However, pure endmembers are very rare, with often either one of the mentioned cations dominating the composition. Thus, the formula can be written in such a way to express common intermediary gedrite samples: (Mg,Fe)^{2+}_{2}(Mg,Fe)^{2+}_{3}Al_{2}(Al_{2}Si_{6}O_{22})(OH)_{2}.

Divalent manganese (Mn) may substitute for some of the magnesium. Trivalent or ferric iron, or titanium^{4+} may replace some of the aluminum (Al). Fluorine and chlorine are common substitutes for the hydroxyl (OH) in amphoboles. Other chemical impurities may include calcium, sodium, and potassium.

Gedrite also forms a series with another ferromagnesian amphibole, anthophyllite.

Gedrite occurs in contact and medium to high grade metamorphic rocks in association with garnet, cordierite, anthophyllite, cummingtonite, sapphirine, sillimanite, kyanite, quartz, staurolite and biotite.

Gedrite was first described for an occurrence in Gèdre, Hautes-Pyrénées, France in 1836.
