= Magnesiocummingtonite =

Variety and Endmember of Cummingtonite

Magnesiocummingtonite is the magnesium rich endmember of the cummingtonite-grunerite series of the amphibole group of minerals, with the following composition: (Mg)_{7}Si_{8}O_{22}(OH)_{2}.

Magnesiocummingtonite is considered to be an aptly named magnesium rich variety of the mineral cummingtonite which has Fe^{2+} substituting for some of the Mg. Divalent manganese may also substitute for magnesium in the crystal structure.

It may be difficult to distinguish cummingtonite from the Mg rich variety in hand specimens. However, the refractive index, specific gravity and degree of attraction to a magnetic field increases with more Fe content.
