= Chrysotile =

Most commonly encountered form of asbestos

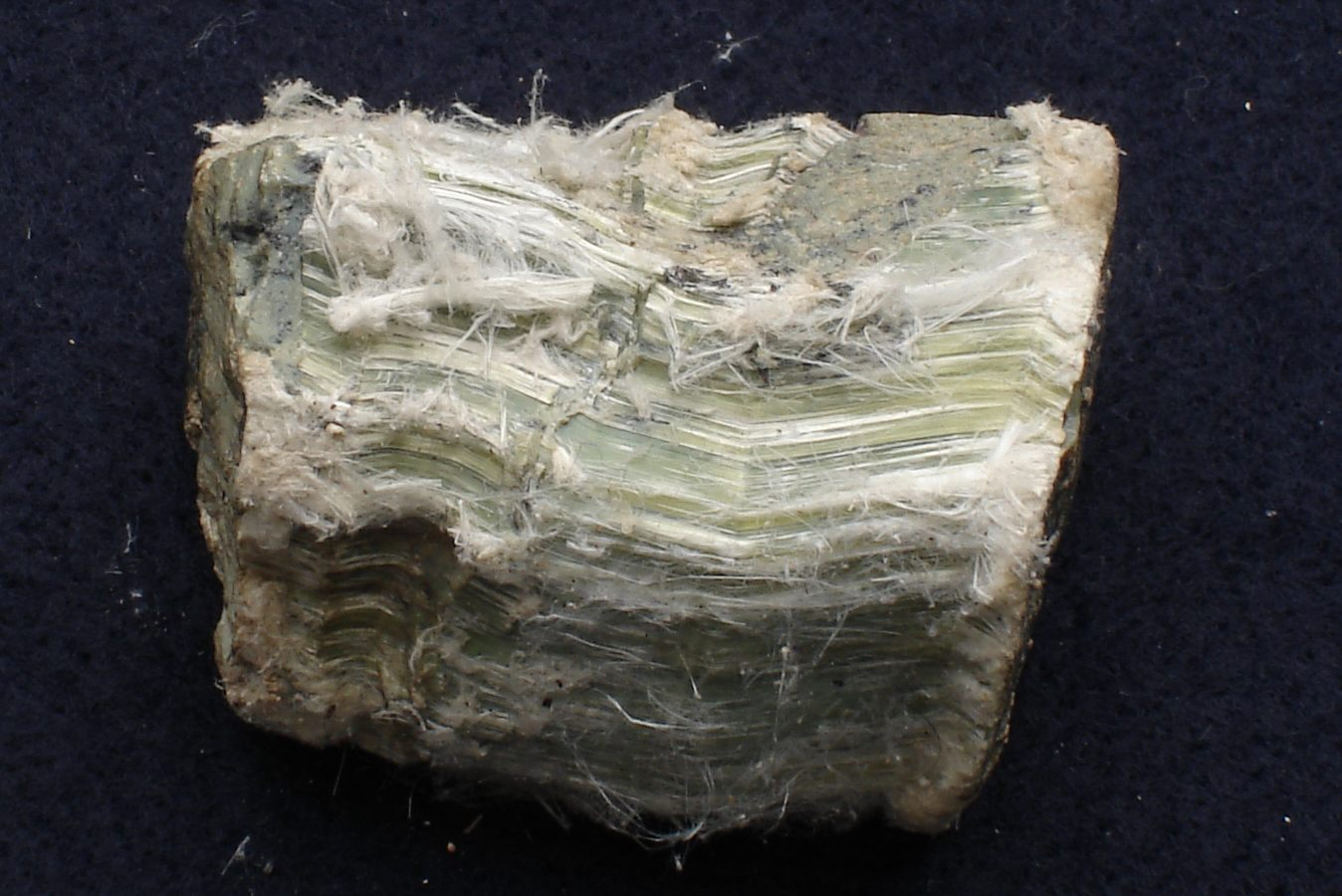

General
- Category: Phyllosilicate minerals
- Group: Kaolinite-Serpentine group, serpentine subgroup
- Formula: Mg_{3}(Si_{2}O_{5})(OH)_{4} (ideal)
- IMA symbol: Ctl
- Strunz classification: 9.ED.15
- Crystal system: Monoclinic: clinochrysotile (most common); Orthorhombic: orthochrysotile and parachrysotile (both rare)
- Crystal class: Clinochrysotile: prismatic (2/m); Orthochrysotile and parachrysotile: pyramidal (mm2)
- Space group: Clinochrysotile: C2/m; Orthochrysotile and parachrysotile: Ccm2_{1}

Identification
- Formula mass: 277.11 g/mol (ideal)
- Colour: White to greyish green
- Crystal habit: Acicular
- Fracture: Fibrous
- Mohs scale hardness: 2.5–3
- Lustre: Silky
- Streak: White
- Diaphaneity: Translucent
- Density: 2.53 g/ml
- Optical properties: Biaxial (+)
- Refractive index: n_{α} = 1.569, n_{γ} = 1.570
- Birefringence: 0.001 (max)
- Dispersion: Relatively weak
- Extinction: parallel
- Melting point: 600–850 °C (1,112–1,562 °F) (decomposes)
- Fusibility: dehydrates at 550–750 °C (1,022–1,382 °F)
- Diagnostic features: White to grayish green thin, flexible curved fiber
- Solubility: Insoluble in water Fibres degrade in dilute acid

Chrysotile (/ˈkrɪsəˌtʌɪl/, /ˈkrɪsəˌtaɪl/, or /ˈkrɪsətɪl/) or white asbestos is the most commonly encountered form of asbestos, accounting for approximately 95% of the asbestos in the United States and a similar proportion in other countries. It is a soft, fibrous silicate mineral in the serpentine subgroup of phyllosilicates; as such, it is distinct from other asbestiform minerals in the amphibole group. Its idealized chemical formula is Mg_{3}(Si_{2}O_{5})(OH)_{4}. The material has physical properties which make it desirable for inclusion in building materials, but poses serious health risks when dispersed into air and inhaled.

== Polytypes ==
Three polytypes of chrysotile are known. These are very difficult to distinguish in hand specimens, and polarized light microscopy must normally be used. Some older publications refer to chrysotile as a group of minerals—the three polytypes listed below, and sometimes pecoraite as well—but the 2006 recommendations of the International Mineralogical Association prefer to treat it as a single mineral with a certain variation in its naturally occurring forms.

Name	Crystal system	Type locality	mindat.org reference	Unit cell parameters	Crystal structure reference
Clinochrysotile	monoclinic	Złoty Stok*, Lower Silesia, Poland	1071	a = 5.3 Å; b = 9.19 Å; c = 14.63 Å; β = 93°	
Orthochrysotile	orthorhombic	Kadapa* district, Andhra Pradesh, India	3025	a = 5.34 Å; b = 9.24 Å; c = 14.2 Å	
Parachrysotile	orthorhombic	uncertain	3083	a = 5.3 Å; b = 9.24 Å; c = 14.71 Å	
Source: mindat.org. *Złoty Stok and Kadapa have formerly been known as Reichenstein and Cuddapah respectively, and these names may appear in some publications.

Clinochrysotile is the most common of the three forms, found notably at Val-des-Sources, Quebec, Canada. Its two measurable refractive indices tend to be lower than those of the other two forms. The orthorhombic paratypes may be distinguished by the fact that, for orthochrysotile, the higher of the two observable refractive indices is measured parallel to the long axis of the fibres (as for clinochrysotile); whereas for parachrysotile the higher refractive index is measured perpendicular to the long axis of the fibres.

== Physical properties ==
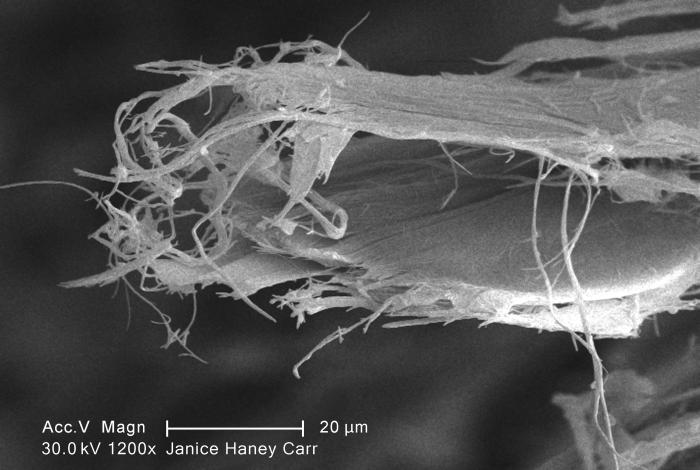
SEM photo of chrysotile

Bulk chrysotile has a hardness similar to a human fingernail and is easily crumbled to fibrous strands composed of smaller bundles of fibrils. Naturally occurring fibre bundles range in length from several millimetres to more than ten centimetres, although industrially processed chrysotile usually has shorter fibre bundles. The diameter of the fibre bundles is 0.1–1 μm, and the individual fibrils are even finer, 0.02–0.03 μm, each fibre bundle containing tens or hundreds of fibrils.

Chrysotile fibres have considerable tensile strength, and may be spun into thread and woven into cloth. They are also resistant to heat and are excellent thermal, electrical and acoustic insulators.

== Chemical properties ==
The idealized chemical formula of chrysotile is Mg_{3}(Si_{2}O_{5})(OH)_{4}, although some of the magnesium ions may be replaced by iron or other cations. Substitution of the hydroxide ions for fluoride, oxide or chloride is also known, but rarer. A related, but much rarer, mineral is pecoraite, in which all the magnesium cations of chrysotile are substituted by nickel cations.

Chrysotile is resistant to even strong bases (asbestos is thus stable in high pH pore water of Portland cement), but when the fibres are attacked by acids, the magnesium ions are selectively dissolved, leaving a silica skeleton. It is thermally stable up to around 550 °C (1,022 °F), at which temperature it starts to dehydrate. Dehydration is complete at about 750 °C (1,380 °F), with the final products being forsterite (Mg-olivine), silica and water.

The global mass balance reaction of the chrysotile dehydration can be written as follows:

$$\ce{\overset{Chrysotile\ (serpentine)}{2Mg3Si2O5(OH)4} ->[750^\circ C] [{dehydration}] \overset{Forsterite}{3Mg2SiO4} + \overset{silica}{SiO2} + \overset{water}{4H2O}}$$

The chrysotile (serpentine) dehydration reaction corresponds to the reverse of the forsterite hydrolysis in the presence of dissolved silica (silicic acid).

== Applications ==
Previously, in the 1990s it was used in asbestos-cement products (like pipes and sheets).

Magnesium sulfate (MgSO_{4}) may be produced by treating chrysotile with sulfuric acid (H_{2}SO_{4}).

== Safety concerns ==
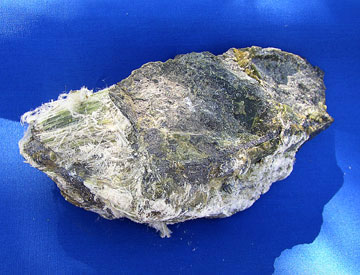
Chrysotile asbestos

Chrysotile has been included with other forms of asbestos in being classified as a human carcinogen by the International Agency for Research on Cancer (IARC) and by the U.S. Department of Health and Human Services. These state that "Asbestos exposure is associated with parenchymal asbestosis, asbestos-related pleural abnormalities, peritoneal mesothelioma, and lung cancer, and it may be associated with cancer at some extra-thoracic sites". In other scientific publications, epidemiologists have published peer-reviewed scientific papers establishing that chrysotile is the main cause of pleural mesothelioma.

Chrysotile has been recommended for inclusion in the Rotterdam Convention on Prior Informed Consent, an international treaty that restricts the global trade in hazardous materials. If listed, exports of chrysotile would only be permitted to countries that explicitly consent to imports. Canada, a major producer of the mineral, has been harshly criticized by the Canadian Medical Association for its opposition to including chrysotile in the convention.

According to EU Regulation 1907/2006 (REACH) the marketing and use of chrysotile, and of products containing chrysotile, are prohibited.

As of March 2024, the U.S. Environmental Protection Agency finalized regulations banning imports of chrysotile asbestos (effective immediately) due to its link to lung cancer and mesothelioma. However, the new rules can allow up to a dozen years to phase out the use of chrysotile asbestos in some manufacturing facilities. The long phase-out period was a result of a strong lobby by Olin Corporation, a major chemical manufacturer, as well as trade groups like the U.S. Chamber of Commerce and the American Chemistry Council. Chrysotile asbestos is now banned in more than 50 other countries.

== Critics of safety regulations ==
=== 1990s: Canada-European dispute GATT dispute ===
In May 1998, Canada requested consultations before the WTO and the European Commission concerning France's 1996 prohibition of the importation and sale of all forms of asbestos. Canada said that the French measures contravened provisions of the Agreements on Sanitary and Phytosanitary Measures and on Technical Barriers to Trade, and the GATT 1994. The EC claimed that safer substitute materials existed to take the place of asbestos. It stressed that the French measures were not discriminatory under the terms of international trade treaties, and were fully justified for public health reasons. The EC further claimed that in the July consultations, it had tried to convince Canada that the measures were justified, and that just as Canada broke off consultations, it (the EC) was in the process of submitting substantial scientific data in favour of the asbestos ban.

=== 2000s: Canadian exports face mounting global criticism ===
In the late 1990s and early 2000s, the Government of Canada continued to claim that chrysotile was much less dangerous than other types of asbestos. Chrysotile continued to be used in new construction across Canada, in ways that are very similar to those for which chrysotile was exported. Similarly, Natural Resources Canada once stated that chrysotile, one of the fibres that make up asbestos, was not as dangerous as once thought. According to a fact sheet from 2003, "current knowledge and modern technology can successfully control the potential for health and environmental harm posed by chrysotile". The Chrysotile Institute, an association partially funded by the Canadian government, also prominently asserted that the use of chrysotile did not pose an environmental problem and the inherent risks in its use were limited to the workplace.

However, under increasing criticism by environmental groups, in May, 2012, the Canadian government stopped funding the Chrysotile Institute. As a result, the Chrysotile Institute has now closed.

The Canadian government continues to draw both domestic and international criticism for its stance on chrysotile, most recently in international meetings about the Rotterdam Convention hearings regarding chrysotile. The CFMEU pointed out that most exports go to developing countries. Canada has pressured countries, including Chile, and other UN member states to avoid chrysotile bans.

In September 2012, governments in Quebec and Canada ended official support for Canada's last asbestos mine in Asbestos, Quebec, now renamed as Val-des-Sources.

== See also ==
- Erionite
- Serpentinite reactions – Rock formed by transformation of olivine
- Antigorite
