= Magnesium iron silicate hydroxide =

Magnesium iron silicate hydroxide may refer to:

- Anthophyllite
- Cummingtonite
- Serpentine group
