= Hornblende =

Complex inosilicate series of minerals

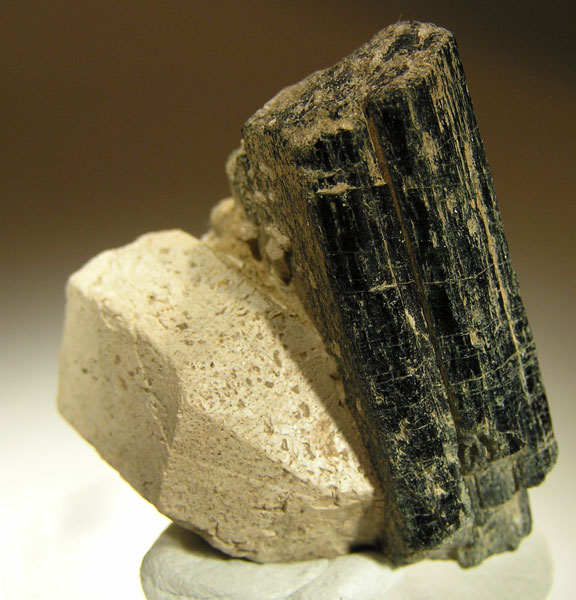
- Hornblende crystal (dark green) about 35 mm long, with apatite (white)

General
- Category: Silicate mineral
- Formula: Ca_{2}(Mg,Fe,Al)_{5}(Al,Si)_{8}O_{22}(OH)_{2}
- IMA symbol: Hbl
- Crystal system: Monoclinic
- Space group: C2/m

Identification
- Color: Black to dark green or brown
- Crystal habit: Hexagonal/granular
- Cleavage: Imperfect at 56° and 124°
- Fracture: Uneven
- Mohs scale hardness: 5–6
- Luster: Vitreous to dull
- Streak: Pale gray, gray-white, white, colorless
- Specific gravity: 2.9
- Pleochroism: Strong

Hornblende is a complex inosilicate series of minerals. It is not a recognized mineral in its own right, but the name is used as a general or field term, to refer to a dark amphibole. Hornblende minerals are common in igneous and metamorphic rocks.

The general formula is (Ca,Na)_{2−3}(Mg,Fe,Al)_{5}(Al,Si)_{8}O_{22}(OH,F)_{2}.

== Physical properties ==
Hornblende has a hardness of 5–6, a specific gravity of 3.0 to 3.6, and is typically an opaque green, dark green, brown, or black color. It tends to form slender prismatic to bladed crystals, diamond-shaped in cross section, or is present as irregular grains or fibrous masses.

Its planes of cleavage intersect at 56° and 124° angles. Hornblende is most often confused with the pyroxene series and biotite mica, which are also dark minerals found in granite and charnockite. Pyroxenes differ in their cleavage planes, which intersect at 87° and 93°.

Hornblende is an inosilicate (chain silicate) mineral, built around double chains of silica tetrahedra. These chains extend the length of the crystal and are bonded to their neighbors by additional metal ions to form the complete crystal structure.

== Compositional variances ==
Hornblende is part of the calcium-amphibole group of amphibole minerals. It is highly variable in composition, and includes at least five solid solution series:

- Magnesiohornblende–ferrohornblende, Ca_{2}[(Mg,Fe)_{4}Al]Si_{7}AlO_{22}(OH)_{2}
- Tschermakite–ferrotschermakite, Ca_{2}[(Mg,Fe)_{3}Al_{2}]Si_{6}Al_{2}O_{22}(OH)_{2}
- Edenite–ferroedenite, NaCa_{2}(Mg,Fe)_{5}Si_{7}AlO_{22}(OH)_{2}
- Pargasite–ferropargasite, NaCa_{2}[(Mg,Fe)_{4}Al]Si_{6}Al_{2}O_{22}(OH)_{2}
- Magnesiohastingstite–hastingsite, NaCa_{2}[(Mg,Fe)_{4}Fe^{3+}]Si_{6}Al_{2}O_{22}(OH)_{2}

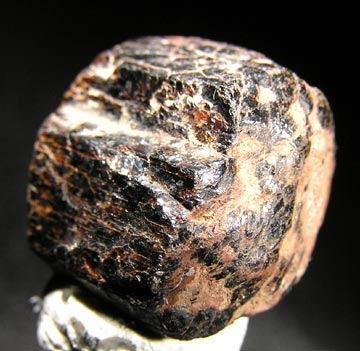
Ferrohornblende, near Bilin, Bohemia, Czech Republic

In addition, titanium, manganese, or chromium can substitute for some of the cations and oxygen, fluorine, or chlorine for some of the hydroxide (OH). The different chemical types are almost impossible to distinguish even by optical or X-ray methods, and detailed chemical analysis using an electron microprobe is required.

There is a solid solution series between hornblende and the closely related amphibole minerals, tremolite–actinolite, at elevated temperature. A miscibility gap exists at lower temperatures, and, as a result, hornblende often contains exsolution lamellae of grunerite.

== Occurrence ==
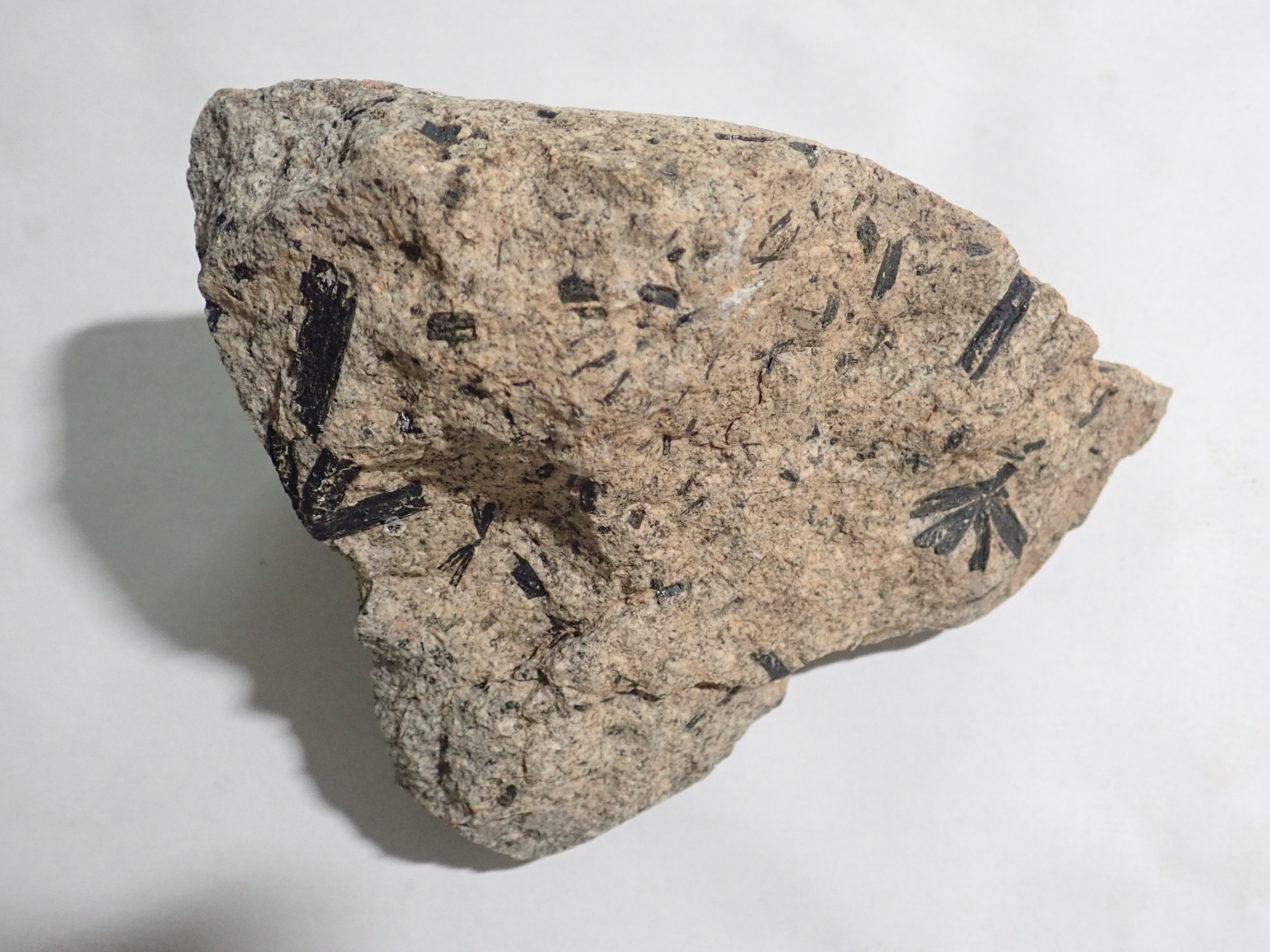
Hornblende diorite from the Henry Mountains, Utah, US

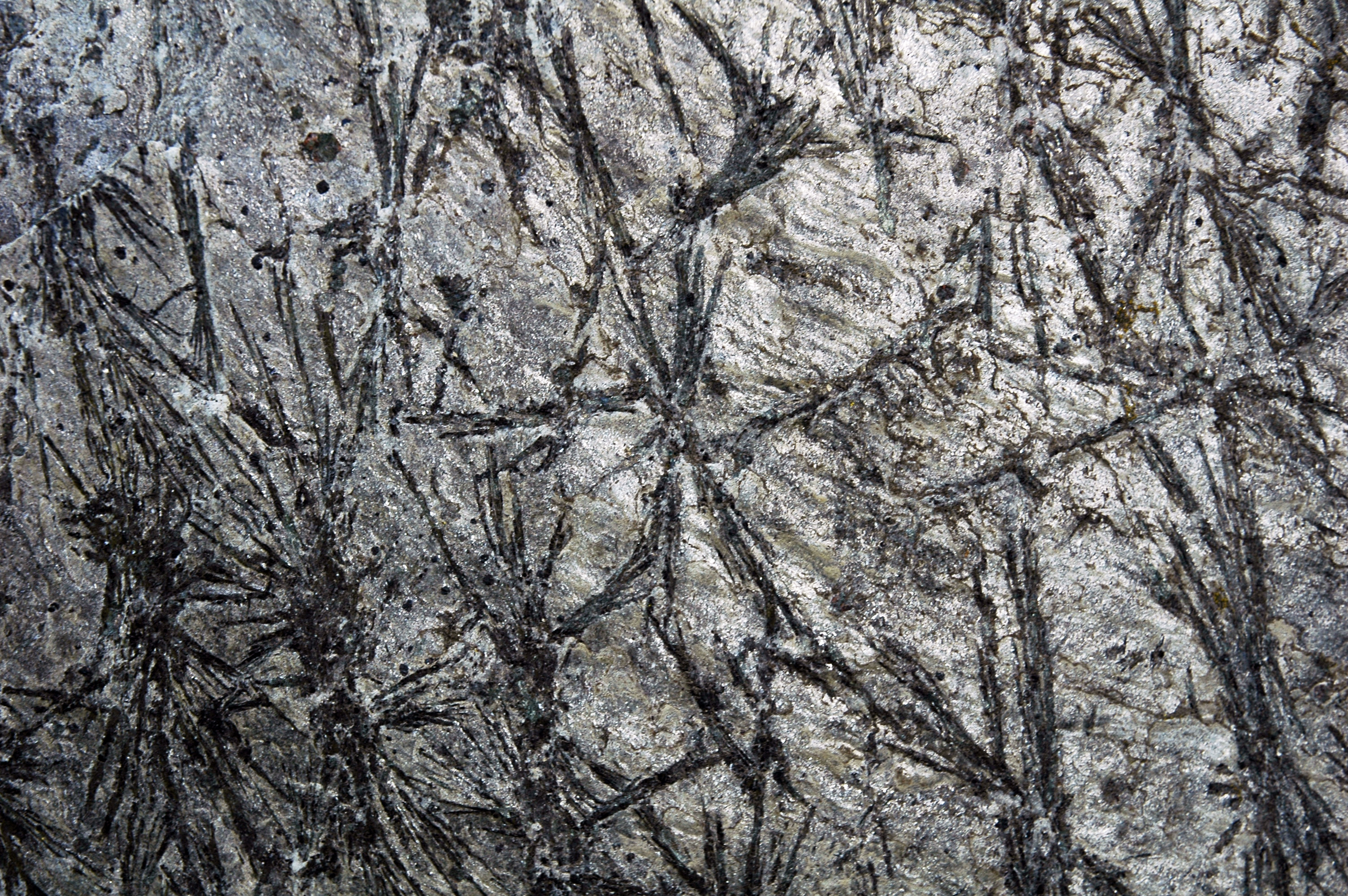
Ordovician hornblende schist near Marlboro, Vermont. The black sprays are hornblende amphibole.

Hornblende is a common constituent of many igneous and metamorphic rocks such as granite, syenite, diorite, gabbro, basalt, andesite, gneiss, and schist. It crystallizes in preference to pyroxene minerals from cooler magma that is richer in silica and water.

It is the principal mineral of amphibolites, which form during medium- to high-grade metamorphism of mafic to intermediate igneous rock (igneous rocks with relative low silica content) in the presence of pore water. Much of the pore water comes from the breakdown of micas or other hydrous minerals. However, hornblende itself breaks down at very high temperatures. Hornblende alters easily to chlorite, biotite, or other mafic minerals.

A rare variety of hornblende contains less than 5% of iron oxide, is gray to white in color, and is named edenite from its locality in Edenville, Orange County, New York.

Oxyhornblende is a variety in which most of the iron has been oxidized to the ferric state, Fe^{3+}. Charge balance is preserved by the substitution of oxygen ions for hydroxide. Oxyhornblende is also typically enriched in titanium. It is found almost exclusively in volcanic rock and is sometimes called basaltic hornblende.

== Etymology ==
The word hornblende is believed to derive from German Horn ('horn') and blende ('deceive'), in allusion to its similar appearance to metal-bearing ore minerals, or ('to blind') referring to its lustre.

== See also ==
- List of minerals
