= Fluoro-edenite =

Fibrous amphibole mineral discovered in Sicily

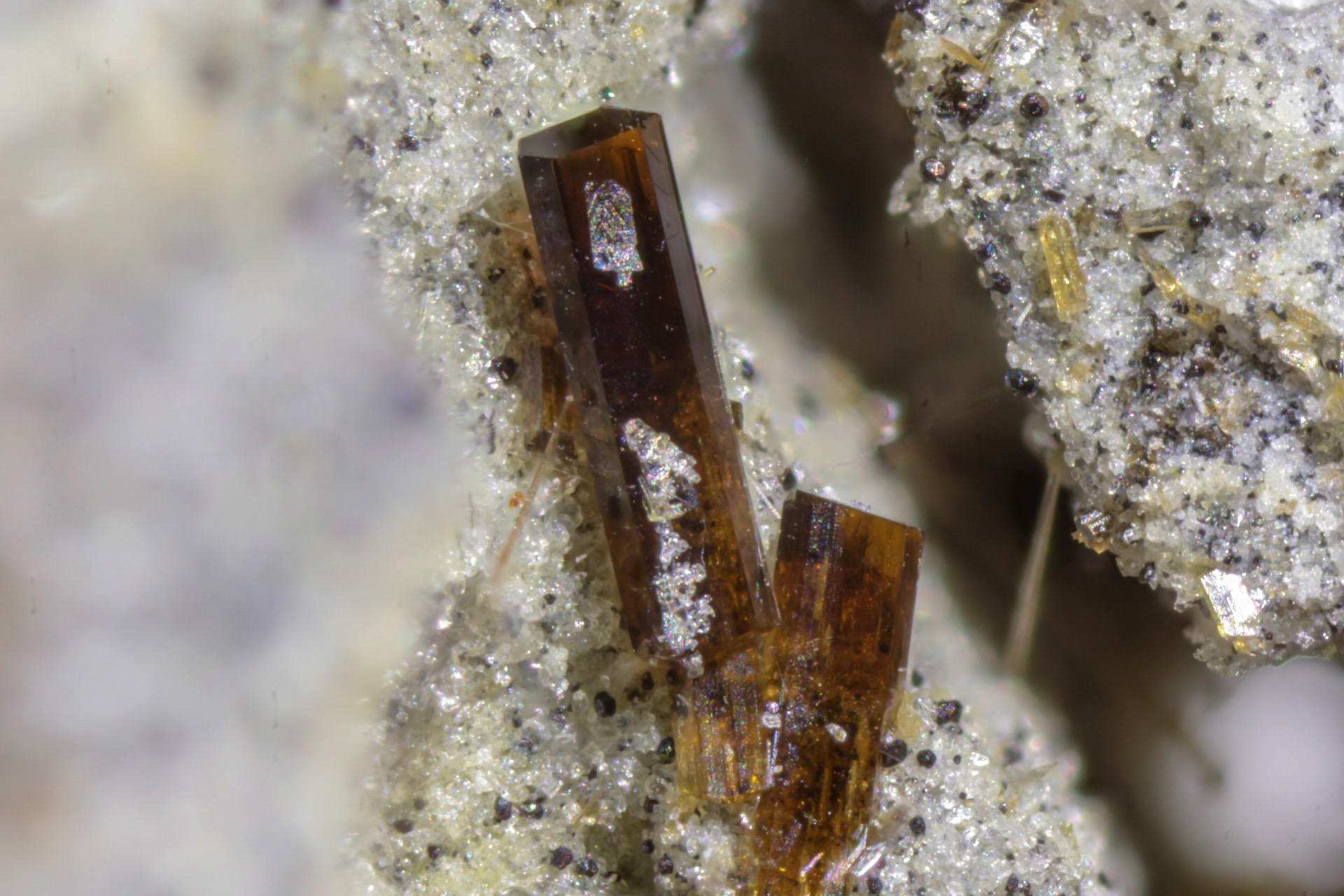
- Fluoro-edenite

General
- Category: Inosilicate minerals, amphibole group
- Formula: NaCa_{2}Mg_{5}(Si_{7}Al)O_{22}F_{2}
- IMA symbol: Fed
- Strunz classification: 9.DE.15
- Crystal system: Monoclinic
- Crystal class: 2/m - Prismatic
- Space group: P2/m (space group 10)
- Unit cell: a = 9.847 Å, b = 18.017 Å, c = 5.268 Å β = 104.84°

Identification
- Colour: Light green to light yellow, grey-black
- Crystal habit: Prismatic, acicular, fibrous (asbestiform)
- Twinning: None mentioned
- Cleavage: Perfect on {110}
- Tenacity: Brittle
- Mohs scale hardness: 5 - 6
- Luster: Vitreous
- Streak: Grey-white, yellowish white
- Specific gravity: 3.09 (Calculated)
- Density: 3.09 g/cm3 (Calculated)
- Optical properties: Biaxial (-)
- Refractive index: nα = 1.6058(5) nβ = 1.6170(5) nγ = 1.6245(5)
- Birefringence: δ = 0.019
- Pleochroism: Not visible
- 2V angle: Calculated: 78°
- Dispersion: r < v
- Extinction: Y ≡ β ⊥ (010), γ ⊥ Z = 26°.
- Ultraviolet fluorescence: None
- Absorption spectra: In the 1300–450 cm–1 range, significant absorption bands occur at 1066, 991, 791, 738, 667, 517, and 475 cm–1.

Fluoro-edenite is a rare amphibole mineral that contains sodium, calcium, magnesium, aluminium, silicon, oxygen and fluorine. It belongs to the same family as the more common mineral edenite but has fluorine as a key component. Fluoro-edenite was first discovered in volcanic rocks near the town of Biancavilla on the south-western flank of Mount Etna in Sicily. It has since been reported in smaller amounts in other locations.

== Chemistry ==
Fluoro-edenite is part of the calcic amphibole group, a subgroup of the amphibole mineral family. Its chemical formula is NaCa_{2}Mg_{5}(Si_{7}Al)O_{22}F_{2}, which means it is made mainly of sodium, calcium and magnesium combined with silica, aluminium and fluorine. Like other amphiboles, its structure is based on double chains of silica tetrahedra, and it crystallises in the monoclinic crystal system. X-ray and infrared studies show that its atomic arrangement is very similar to other fluorine-rich amphiboles in the edenite–pargasite series.

== Location ==
Fluoro-edenite was first discovered in Monte Calvario, close to Biancavilla in eastern Sicily. Here, Fluoro-endnite occurs as prismatic and fibrous crystals in benmoreitic lava that has been altered by hot, fluorine-rich fluids rising through the volcanic rocks of Mount Etna. The same rock has been quarried for sand and aggregate used in local building and road works, which has spread fluoro-edenite fibres into the surrounding environment.

Fluoro-edenite has also been found in Cobden, Ontario, Canada. At that location, it forms dark green to almost black crystals in metamorphic rocks. Samples in this location have been studied using X-ray diffraction together with Raman and infrared spectroscopy to confirm their identity.

== Toxicity ==
Health studies in Biancavilla have found a higher-than-expected number of pleural mesothelioma cases compared with similar populations. The excess has been linked to long-term exposure to airborne fluoro-edenite fibres released from the Monte Calvario quarry. It was proven not to be from any asbestos minerals.

Laboratory experiments using human lung epithelial cells show that fluoro-edenite fibres can attach to the cells, and slow down their growth. The fibres also trigger the release of inflammatory molecules, suggesting a pattern of damage similar to that caused by asbestos fibres and fibrous zeolites.

Based on community studies in Biancavilla and the experimental work on fibres, the International Agency for Research on Cancer has classified fibrous fluoro-edenite as carcinogenic to humans (Group 1), concluding that there is sufficient evidence that exposure can cause mesothelioma.
