= Erionite =

Fibrous zeolite mineral

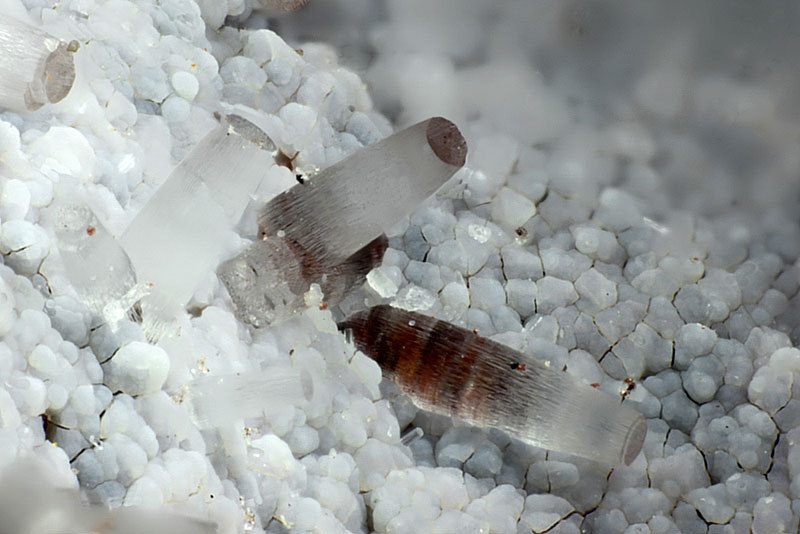

General
- Category: Tectosilicate minerals
- Group: Zeolite group
- Formula: (Na_{2},K_{2},Ca)_{2}Al_{4}Si_{14}O_{36}•15H_{2}O
- IMA symbol: Eri
- Crystal system: Hexagonal
- Crystal class: Dihexagonal dipyramidal (6mmm); H-M symbol: (6/m 2/m 2/m)
- Space group: P6_{3}/mmc (no. 194)

Identification
- Color: White, Green, Gray, Orange
- Crystal habit: Acicular - Occurs as needle-like crystals (asbestiform).
- Cleavage: [010] Distinct
- Fracture: Splintery
- Mohs scale hardness: 3.5-4
- Luster: Vitreous - silky
- Streak: white
- Specific gravity: 2.09 - 2.13 avg = 2.11
- Optical properties: Uniaxial (-)
- Refractive index: n_{ω} = 1.4711, n_{ε} = 1.474
- Birefringence: δ = 0.0191
- Other characteristics: non-magnetic, non-radioactive, highly toxic and carcinogenic if inhaled

Erionite is a naturally occurring asbestiform mineral that belongs to a group of minerals called zeolites. It usually is found in volcanic ash that has been altered by weathering and ground water. Erionite forms brittle, wool-like fibrous masses in the hollows of rock formations and has an internal molecular structure similar to chabazite. This mineral is likely as toxic as blue asbestos; however, erionite is not currently regulated by the U.S. Environmental Protection Agency and there are no occupational exposure limits for this substance. Erionite was first described by A.S. Eakle in 1898, as white woolly fibrous masses in cavities in rhyolite lava near Durkee, Oregon. It was originally thought to be another relatively rare zeolite named offretite, which is very similar to erionite in appearance and chemical composition.

== Properties ==
The chemical composition of erionite is approximately represented by the formula (Na_{2},K_{2},Ca)_{2}Al_{4}Si_{14}O_{36}•15H_{2}O. It can be differentiated into Erionite-Na, Erionite-K, and Erionite-Ca forms based on the most dominant component. Erionite has a hexagonal, cage-like structure composed of a framework of linked tetrahedra. It consists of white prismatic crystals in radiating groups of crystal fiber. Erionite absorbs up to 20% of its weight in water, has a specific gravity of 2.02 to 2.13, and has gas absorption, ion exchange, and catalytic properties that are highly selective and depend on the molecular size of the absorbed compounds. Zeolites, in general, have good thermal stability, rehydration kinetics, and water vapor adsorption capacity.

== Toxicity and carcinogenicity ==
Erionite is known to be a human carcinogen and is listed by the International Agency for Research on Cancer as a Group 1 Carcinogen. The prevalence of malignant pleural and peritoneal mesothelioma due to erionite exposure in the Cappadocia region of Central Anatolia is very high. Descriptive studies have reported an excess of mortality from mesothelioma in individuals living in three Turkish villages where there was chronic exposure to erionite; only two cases of mesothelioma occurred in the control village, both in women born elsewhere. An excess of lung cancer also was reported in two of the three villages contaminated with erionite. Respirable erionite fibers were detected in air samples collected from the affected villages, and lung tissue samples collected from mesothelioma cases contained erionite fibers. A higher proportion of ferruginous bodies with a zeolite core were found in inhabitants of the contaminated villages than of those from the two control villages. Erionite is reportedly present in the local volcanic tuff.

There is sufficient evidence of carcinogenicity of erionite in experimental animals. Rats exposed to erionite by inhalation or injection (intrapleural or intraperitoneal) and mice exposed by intraperitoneal injection had a high incidence of mesothelioma. Erionite administered by the intraplueral route has been shown to be 200 times more carcinogenic than asbestos. Additionally, although carcinogenic properties of erionite have been discovered by investigating the erionite found in Central Anatolia, Turkey, no difference in their carcinogenic capacity has been observed when it was compared to the erionite obtained in North Dakota, USA.

Studies have shown that erionite is far more potent than asbestos as a carcinogen. In animal studies which compared erionite to other asbestos minerals, it proved to be 300 to 800 times more potent than chrysotile. When compared to the most potent asbestos crocidolite, erionite was 100 to 500 times more potent.

== Exposure ==
Deposits of fibrous erionite are located in Arizona, Nevada, Oregon, and Utah, as well in urban Auckland in New Zealand. These zeolite beds may be up to 15 ft (4.6 m) thick and may lie in surface outcroppings. Erionite fibers have been detected in samples of road dust in Nevada and U.S. residents of the Intermountain West may be potentially exposed to fibrous erionite in ambient air. In the summer of 2009 North Dakota began a study of possible erionite exposure among residents. Erionite has also been identified in samples from the Tertiary Arikaree Formation in southeast Montana and northwest South Dakota.

In the past, occupational exposure occurred from erionite mining and production operation. Nowadays potential occupational exposure to erionite usually occurs during the production and mining of other zeolites. Erionite was also reported to be a minor component in some commercial zeolites. Therefore, the use of other zeolites may result in potential exposure to erionite for the workers and the general population who use the zeolites in a variety of processes and products. Total dust exposures for miners in an open-pit zeolite mine that contained some erionite in Arizona ranged from 0.01 to 13.7 mg/m^{3}; respirable dust in the mining area was 0.01 to 1.4 mg/m^{3}. Erionite is held responsible for the high incidence of lung cancer, especially malignant mesothelioma within the Turkish village of Tuzkoy near Nevsehir in the popular tourist region of Cappadoccia.

== Gallery ==
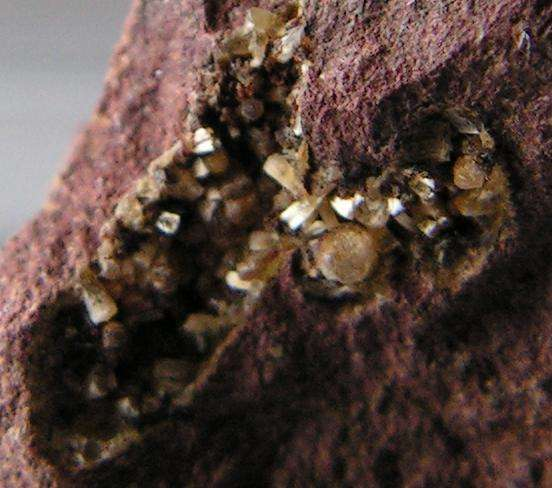
Erionite-Ca

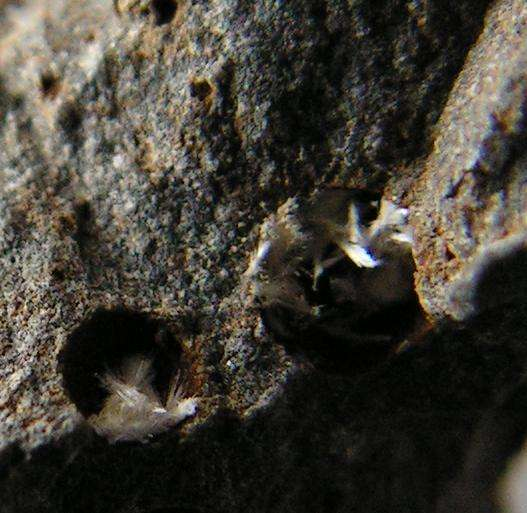
Erionite-K

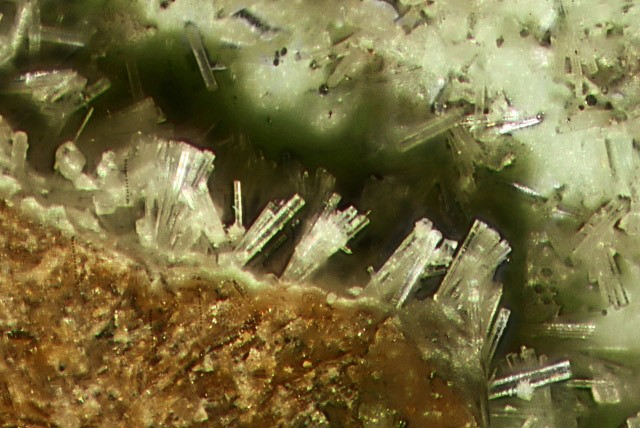
Erionite and offretite

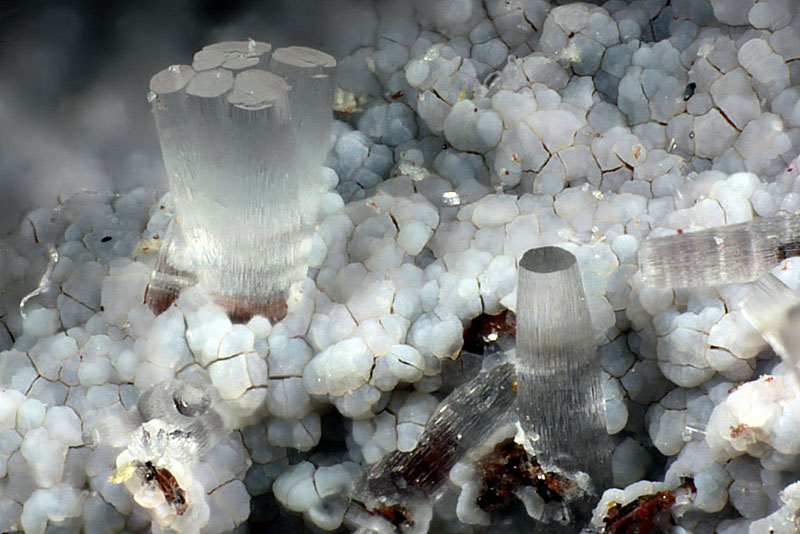
Erionite in Arizona

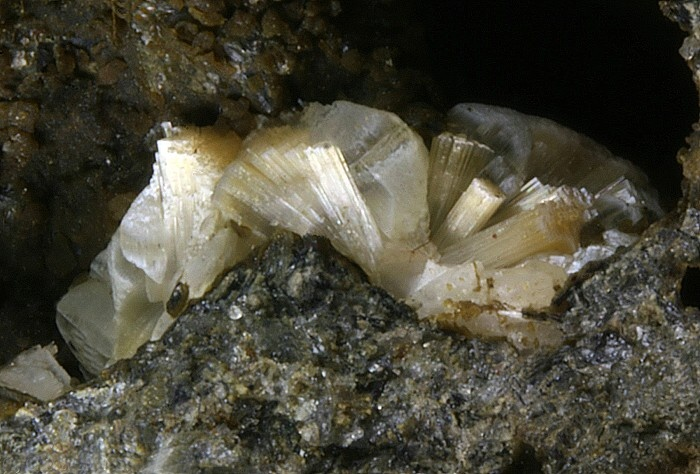
Erionite in Veneto

== See also ==
- Asbestosis
- Chrysotile
- Ferrierite
