= Walter Frederick Ferrier =

Canadian geologist and mining engineer

- Education: McGill University
- Scientific career
- Fields: geology and mining

Walter Frederick Ferrier (1865–1950) was a Canadian geologist and mining engineer.

He graduated from McGill University's school of mining engineering. As an active mineral collector, he frequently visited mining offices directly to request specimens. Consequently, he assembled large collections of high-quality mineral specimens that remain well-regarded. His efforts preserved many classic specimens that might otherwise have been lost to public and private collections. The specimens he gathered contributed significantly to the mineral collections of the Smithsonian in Washington DC, the Royal Ontario Museum in Toronto, Ontario, the University of Alberta, and the museum particularly dear to his heart, the Redpath Museum at McGill University in Montreal.

During one of his collecting trips he noticed a bladed mineral enclosed in chalcedony on the edge of Kamloops Lake in the Kamloops Mining Division, British Columbia, Canada. It turned out to be a new member of the Zeolite family of minerals. Subsequently, it was named after him - Ferrierite. The type material of this mineral is stored at the Redpath Museum and is part of a separate collection that also bears his name.
