= Ferrierite =

Zeolite mineral group

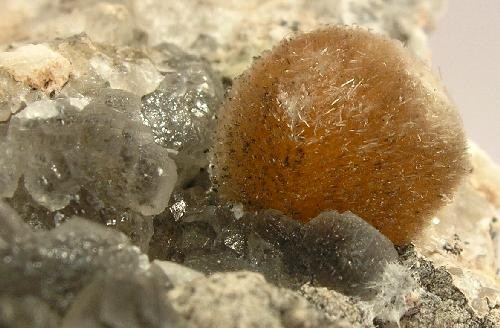
- Ferrierite-Mg, Kamloops Lake, British Columbia, Canada

General
- Category: Tectosilicate minerals
- Group: Zeolite group
- Formula: ("A"position)_{3−5}Mg[Al_{5−7}Si_{27.5−31}O_{72}]·18H_{2}O
- IMA symbol: Frr
- Strunz classification: 9.GD.50
- Crystal system: Orthorhombic
- Crystal class: Dipyramidal (mmm); H-M symbol: (2/m 2/m 2/m)
- Space group: Immm; P2_{1}/n (Ferrierite-Na)

Identification
- Color: white, colorless, pinkish, orange to red
- Crystal habit: small plates or short prismatic crystals, asbestiform needles
- Mohs scale hardness: 3 – 3 1/2
- Streak: white

The ferrierite group of zeolite minerals (the FER structure) consists of four very similar species: ferrierite-Mg, ferrierite-Na, ferrierite-NH4 and ferrierite-K, based on the dominant cation in the A location. ferrierite-Mg and ferrierite-K are orthorhombic minerals and ferrierite-Na is monoclinic with highly variable cationic composition (Na,K)_{2}Mg(Si,Al)_{18}O_{36}(OH)·9H_{2}O. Calcium and other ions are often also present. They are found in vitreous to pearly, often radiating, spherical aggregates of thin blade-shaped transparent to translucent crystals.

Ferrierite typically occurs as an alteration mineral in basaltic rocks and in tuffaceous sediments. In North America, it is found at Kamloops Lake, BC, Canada (the original type locality) and Leavitt Lake, California. Ferrierite was named for Canadian geologist and mining engineer Walter Frederick Ferrier (1865–1950).

== Synthetic ferrierite ==
Synthetic ferrierites have even greater cation variability and have important uses as commercial filters and ion-exchange beds.

Ferrierite-H can be used as a catalyst in the chemical industry for the acid-catalyzed skeletal isomerization of n-butenes to isobutene, the raw material for production of methyl tert-butyl ether (MTBE).

The hydrophobic all-silica ferrierite (Si-FER) has very high selectivity in the separation of alcohol–water mixtures, due to the very restrictive shape and space constraints of the FER framework type. At high pressure, Si-FER can achieve the separation of an ethanol–water liquid mixture into supramolecular blocks of its components, namely, ethanol dimer wires and water tetramer squares.

== Potential toxicity ==
Ferrierite is normally found as small plates or short prismatic crystals. However recent research found that in some locations, it grows as very thin needles or fibers. These fibrous varieties have been found in several localities, including northern Italy, Lovelock (Nevada, USA), and British Columbia (Canada).

Scientific research into the fibrous ferrierite’s habit has become very important because of its potential health risks that could be similar to minerals like asbestos and erionite, and is strongly linked to fiber shape and size. Long, thin, durable fibers can be inhaled deep into the lungs, where they may persist and irritate lung tissue.

Measurements of fibrous ferrierite from northern Italy and from the Lovelock, Nevada deposits show that many fibers fall within the “breathable/respirable” size range used for occupational health screening, meaning they are small enough to reach the lower lungs if airborne and inhaled. Surface studies also found that fibrous ferrierite can be chemically and physically similar to fibrous erionite, which is known to be highly carcinogenic. Researches recommended a precautionary approach when fibrous ferrierite is present until direct toxicology testing is completed.

Ferrierite has not been formally classified as a human carcinogen, but the occurrence of naturally fibrous–asbestiform ferrierite and its respirable fiber sizes are reasons it continues to be studied for possible health effects in specific locations.

== See also ==
- List of minerals
- List of minerals named after people
