= Winchite =

Mineral

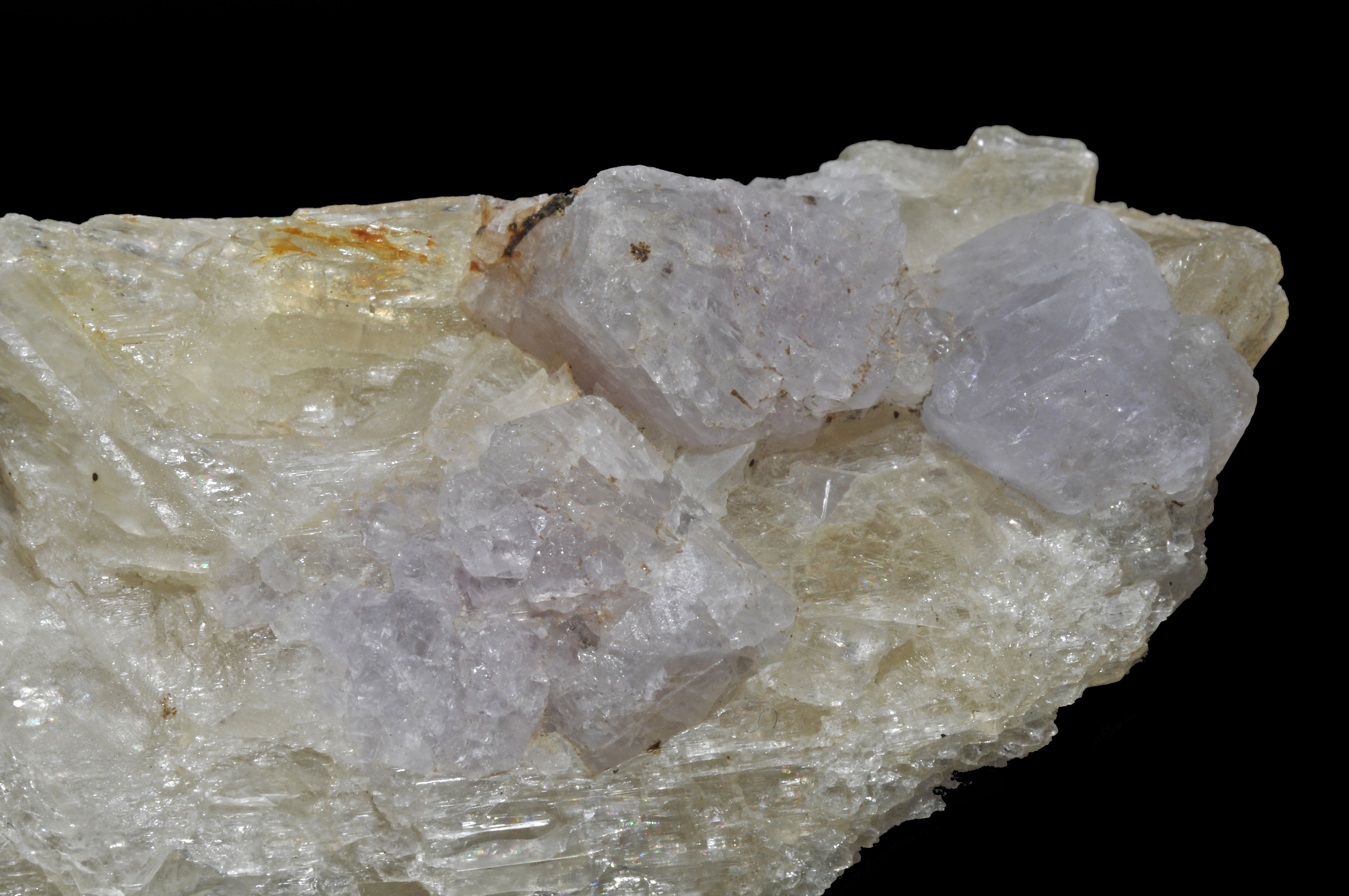

General
- Category: Minerals
- IMA symbol: Wnc
- Crystal system: Monoclinic

Identification
- Mohs scale hardness: 5½
- Lustre: Vitreous
- Streak: Pale blue-grey

Winchite is a mineral in the amphibole group.

== Name ==
The mineral is named after Howard James Winch, who was the one discovered it in Madhya Pradesh, India. Sir Lewis Fermor was the one who named the mineral.

Winchite is also called Aluminowinchite or Eckrite.

== Chemistry ==
Winchite has a chemical composition similar to tremolite. But it contains iron, potassium, sodium, and manganese.

== Occurrence ==
Winchite occurs on grains of riebeckite. It can be found in schist with metamorphosed manganese deposits.

== Distribution ==
It has been found on the south eastern part of Anglesey. It has been found in Kajlidongri mine located in India as well at Ward creek in California.
