= Cummingtonite =

Silicate mineral

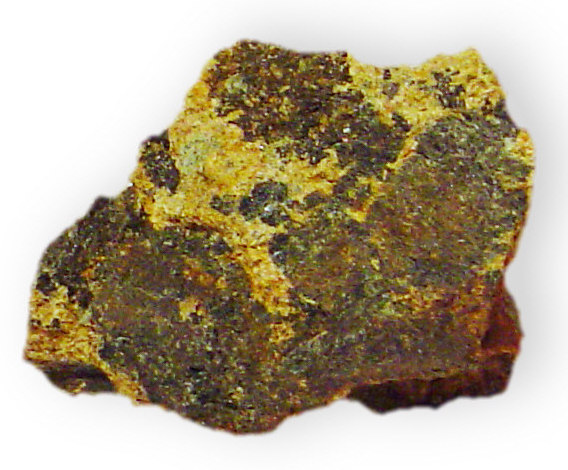

General
- Category: Inosilicate
- Formula: (Mg,Fe^{2+})_{2}(Mg,Fe^{2+})_{5}Si_{8}O_{22}(OH)_{2}
- IMA symbol: Cum
- Strunz classification: 9.DE.05
- Crystal system: Monoclinic
- Crystal class: Prismatic (2/m); H-M symbol: (2/m)
- Space group: Monoclinic; Space group: C2/m
- Unit cell: a = 9.53 Å, b = 18.23 Å, c = 5.32 Å; β = 101.97°; Z = 2

Identification
- Color: Dark green, brown, gray, beige; colorless to pale green in thin section
- Crystal habit: Rarely as distinct crystals. Columnar to fibrous and granular
- Twinning: Simple and lamellar – common
- Cleavage: Good on {110} intersecting at 54 and 126°
- Fracture: Splintery
- Tenacity: Brittle
- Mohs scale hardness: 5–6
- Luster: Vitreous to silky
- Diaphaneity: Translucent, will transmit light on thin edges.
- Specific gravity: 3.1–3.6
- Optical properties: Biaxial (+)
- Refractive index: n_{α} = 1.639–1.671 n_{β} = 1.647–1.689 n_{γ} = 1.664–1.708
- Birefringence: δ = 0.025–0.037
- Pleochroism: With increasing iron content, weak; X = Y = colorless; Z = pale green
- 2V angle: Measured: 65° to 90°, Calculated: 70° to 90°
- Diagnostic features: Characterized by light brown color and needlelike, often radiating habit. Difficult to distinguish from anthophyllite or gedrite without optical and/or X-ray tests.

Cummingtonite (/ˈkʌmɪŋtənaɪt/ KUM-ing-tə-nyte) is a metamorphic amphibole with the chemical composition (Mg,Fe^{2+})_{2}(Mg,Fe^{2+})_{5}Si_{8}O_{22}(OH)_{2}, magnesium iron silicate hydroxide.

Monoclinic cummingtonite is compositionally similar and polymorphic with orthorhombic anthophyllite, which is a much more common form of magnesium-rich amphibole, the latter being metastable.

Cummingtonite shares few compositional similarities with alkali amphiboles such as arfvedsonite, glaucophane-riebeckite. There is little solubility between these minerals due to different crystal habit and inability of substitution between alkali elements and ferro-magnesian elements within the amphibole structure.

== Name and discovery ==
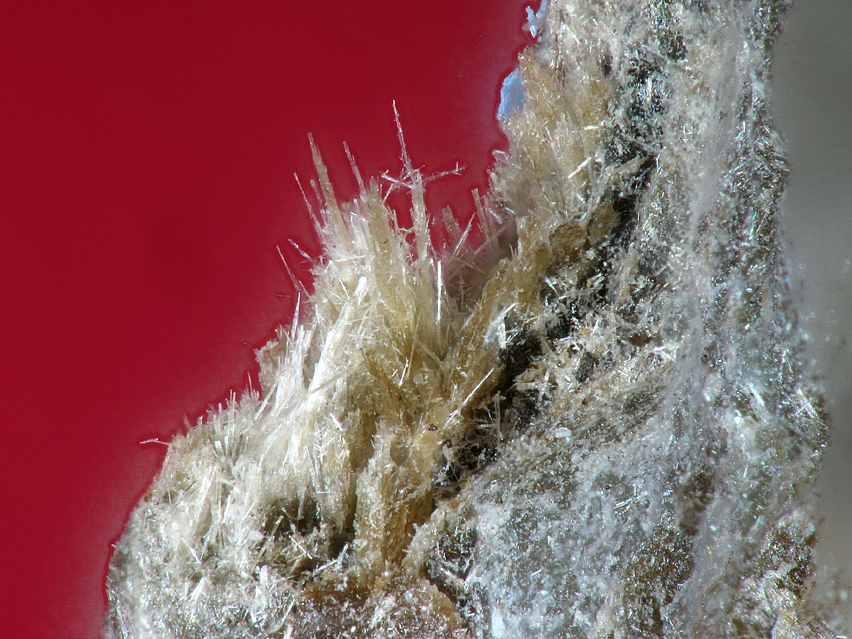
Fibrous, brownish crystals of cummingtonite – Locality: Dannemora Mine, Uppsala Län, Uppland, Sweden

Cummingtonite was named after the town of Cummington, Massachusetts, where it was discovered in 1824. It is also found in Sweden, South Africa, Scotland, and New Zealand.

== Chemistry ==
Cummingtonite is a member of the cummingtonite-grunerite solid solution series which ranges from Mg_{7}Si_{8}O_{22}(OH)_{2} for magnesiocummingtonite to the iron rich grunerite endmember Fe_{7}Si_{8}O_{22}(OH)_{2}. Cummingtonite is used to describe minerals of this formula with between 30 and 70 per cent Fe_{7}Si_{8}O_{22}(OH)_{2}. Thus, cummingtonite is the series intermediate.

Manganese also substitutes for (Fe,Mg) within cummingtonite amphibole, replacing B site atoms. These minerals are found in high-grade metamorphic banded iron formation and form a compositional series between Mn_{2}Mg_{5}Si_{8}O_{22}(OH)_{2} (tirodite) and Mn_{2}Fe_{5}Si_{8}O_{22}(OH)_{2} (dannemorite).

Calcium, sodium and potassium concentrations in cummingtonite are low. Cummingtonite tends toward more calcium substitution than related anthophyllite. Similarly, cummingtonite has lower ferric iron and aluminium than anthophyllite.

Amosite is a rare asbestiform variety of grunerite that was mined as asbestos only in the eastern part of the Transvaal Province of South Africa. The origin of the name is Amosa, the acronym for the mining company "Asbestos Mines of South Africa".

== Occurrence ==
Cummingtonite is commonly found in metamorphosed magnesium-rich rocks and occurs in amphibolites. Usually it coexists with hornblende or actinolite, magnesium clinochlore chlorite, talc, serpentine-antigorite minerals or metamorphic pyroxene. Magnesium-rich cummingtonite can also coexist with anthophyllite.

Cummingtonite has also been found in some felsic volcanic rocks such as dacites. Manganese rich species can be found in metamorphosed Mn-rich rock units. The grunerite end member is characteristic of the metamorphosed iron formations of the Lake Superior region and the Labrador Trough. With prograde metamorphism cummingtonite and grunerite morph to members of the olivine and pyroxene series.
