= Mindat.org =

Non-commercial online mineralogical database

- Owners: Hudson Institute of Mineralogy, Keswick, Virginia
- Creators: Jolyon Ralph, et al.
- Industry: Mineralogy
- Website: mindat.org
- Commercial: No
- Launched: 10 October 2000; 25 years ago
- OCLC number: 643335336

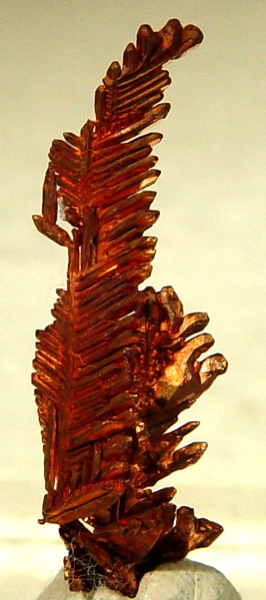
Crystalline copper "feather" from Itauz Mine, Kazakhstan, an example of a photo from the Mindat database.

Mindat.org is a non-commercial interactive online database covering minerals around the world. Originally created by Jolyon Ralph as a private project in 1993, it was launched as a community-editable website in October 2000. As of 2023 it is operated by the Hudson Institute of Mineralogy.

== History ==
Mindat was started in 1993 as a personal database project by Jolyon Ralph. He then developed further versions as a Microsoft Windows application before launching a community-editable database website on 10 October 2000.

After further development taking to the Internet stage, Mindat.org became an outreach program of the Hudson Institute of Mineralogy, a 501(c)(3) not-for-profit educational foundation incorporated in the state of New York. To address the increasing open data needs from individual researchers and organizations, as of 2021 Mindat.org has started to build and maintain an open data API for data query and access, and the efforts have received support from the National Science Foundation.

== Description ==
Mindat claims to be the largest mineral database and mineralogical reference website on the Internet. It is crowd-sourced and also expert-reviewed and curated for data quality. The database is used by professional mineralogists, geologists, and amateur mineral collectors alike, and is referenced in many publications.

The database covers a variety of topics: scientific articles, field trip reports, mining history, advice for collectors, book reviews, mineral entries, localities, and photographs. Much of the information is from published literature, but registered editors may add and revise information and references. Editors are vetted for their expertise, in order to ensure accuracy. References have to be provided in the proper format, and editors own the copyright of data that they have contributed. The data is organized into mineral and locality pages, with links that allow for easy navigation among the pages.

The pages about minerals include individual minerals and rocks. Naming conventions adhere to the various standards and definitions as published by the International Mineralogical Association, the British Geological Survey, and the Meteoritical Society.

It interfaces directly with the Mineral Evolution Database (MED), and is an important source for scientific research. Many studies have used Mindat for locality information when building knowledge about diversity and distribution of minerals.

As of 2021, it included:

- Around 300,000 mineral localities
- Over 1.2 million mineral-locality pairs
- Nearly a million photographs
- Information on Apollo lunar samples and meteorites

== Recognition ==
Jolyon Ralph was awarded the Mineralogical Society of America's Distinguished Public Service Medal in 2011 for his work on Mindat.org.
