= Edenite =

Amphibole, double chain inosilicate mineral

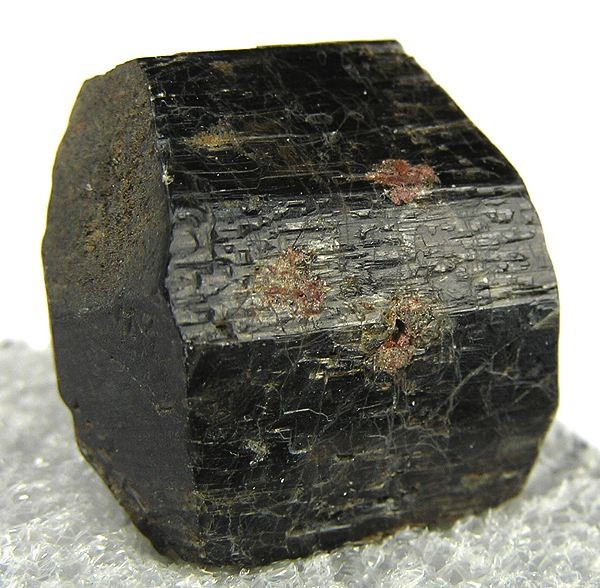
- Edenite crystal from Bancroft District, Ontario

General
- Category: Amphibole mineral
- Formula: NaCa_{2}Mg_{5}(Si_{7}Al)O_{22}(OH)_{2}
- IMA symbol: Ed
- Strunz classification: 9.DE.15
- Crystal system: Monoclinic
- Crystal class: Prismatic (2/m) (same H-M symbol)
- Space group: C2/m
- Unit cell: a = 9.83, b = 17.95 c = 5.3 [Å], β = 105.18°; Z = 2

Identification
- Formula mass: 834.25 g/mol
- Color: White to gray, pale to dark green, also brown and pale pinkish-brown
- Crystal habit: Prismatic crystals, fibrous, as reaction rims on pyroxenes
- Twinning: Simple or multiple parallel to {010}
- Cleavage: Good on (110)
- Fracture: Conchoidal
- Tenacity: Brittle
- Mohs scale hardness: 5–6
- Luster: Vitreous
- Streak: White
- Diaphaneity: Semitransparent
- Specific gravity: 3.05–3.37
- Optical properties: Biaxial (+)
- Refractive index: n_{α} = 1.606 – 1.649, n_{β} = 1.617 – 1.660, n_{γ} = 1.631 – 1.672
- Birefringence: δ = 0.025
- Pleochroism: Distinct, greens, blue-greens, and yellow-browns
- 2V angle: 50–82°

Edenite or edenitic hornblende is a double chain silicate mineral of the amphibole group with the general chemical composition NaCa_{2}Mg_{5}(Si_{7}Al)O_{22}(OH)_{2}. Edenite is named for the locality of Edenville, Orange County, New York, where it was first described.

== Occurrence ==
Edenite has been found primarily in metamorphic rocks, occurring in pods of other magnesium-rich minerals within a marble formation or with garnet-rich lherzolites from deep within the Earth's crust. Thus, finding edenite in the field can indicate high-temperature regional metamorphism of the surrounding rocks.

== Uses and importance ==
While edenite is not important for commercial or industrial applications, it is often studied because of its unique chemical substitution properties. Results from research performed on amphiboles have shown that edenite is particularly suited for fitting chloride anions into its chemical framework. This makes edenite a good candidate for use in chlorine isotope fractionation in amphibole-bearing rocks. Many synthetic variations of edenite are also used in geochemical research to produce a boron analogue of fluoroedenite.

== Crystal habit ==
Edenite is a member of the monoclinic crystal system and is in the crystal class 2/m (space group C2/m). This means crystalline edenite is symmetrical around a two-fold rotation axis that is then reflected across a mirror plane perpendicular to the long axis of the mineral.

== Optical properties ==
Edenite is a biaxial positive mineral. When viewed in thin section with a petrographic microscope, it is white-gray with pale green pleochroism in plane-polarized light. Under crossed polars, its interference colors range from first order gray to first order blue.
