= Riebeckite =

Sodium-rich member of the amphibole group of silicate minerals

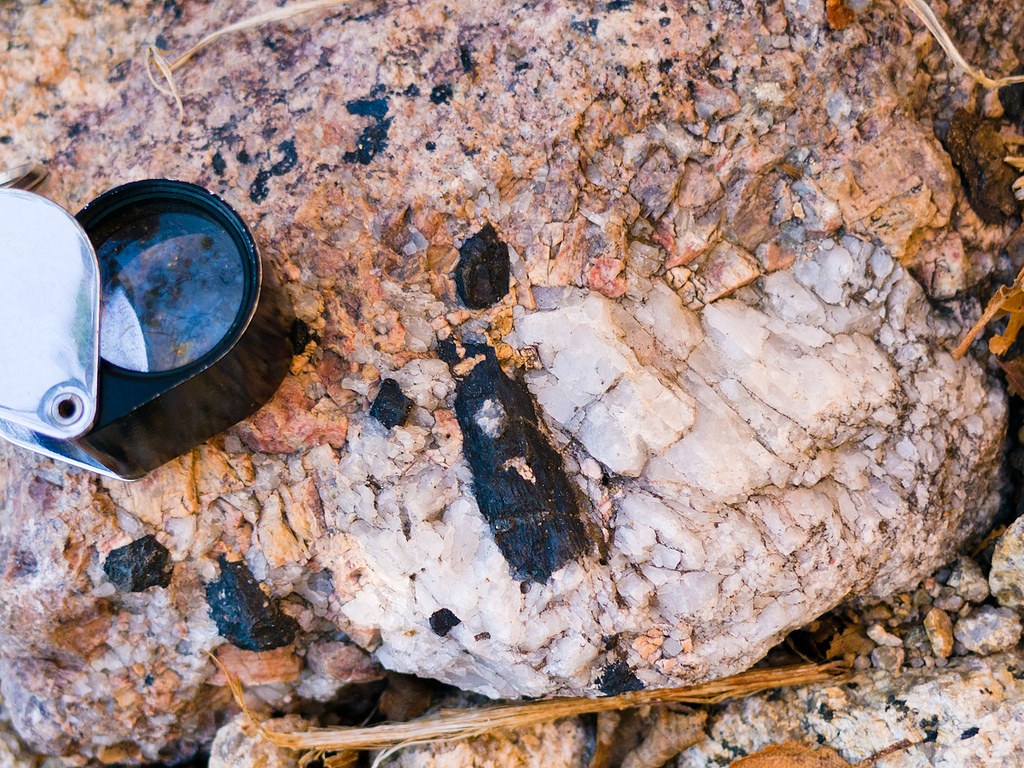
- Black riebeckite in an alkaline pegmatite from Lindinosa near Évisa, Corsica, France

General
- Category: Silicate mineral
- Formula: Na_{2}(Fe^{2+}_{3}Fe^{3+}_{2})Si_{8}O_{22}(OH)_{2}
- IMA symbol: Rbk
- Crystal system: Monoclinic
- Crystal class: Prismatic (2/m) (same H-M symbol)
- Space group: C2/m
- Unit cell: a = 9.76 Å, b = 18.04 Å c = 5.33 Å; β = 103.59°; Z = 2

Identification
- Color: Black, dark blue; dark blue to yellow-green in thin section
- Crystal habit: As prismatic crystals, commonly fibrous, asbestiform; earthy, massive
- Twinning: Simple or multiple twinning parallel to {100}
- Cleavage: Perfect on {110}, intersecting at 56° and 124°; partings on {100} and {010}
- Fracture: Conchoidal to uneven
- Tenacity: Brittle
- Mohs scale hardness: 6
- Luster: Vitreous to silky
- Streak: Pale to bluish gray
- Diaphaneity: Semitransparent
- Specific gravity: 3.28–3.44
- Optical properties: Biaxial (−)
- Refractive index: n_{α} = 1.680–1.698 n_{β} = 1.683–1.700 n_{γ} = 1.685–1.706
- Birefringence: δ = 0.005–0.008
- Pleochroism: X = blue, indigo; Y = yellowish green, yellow brown; Z = dark blue
- 2V angle: Measured: 68° to 85°, Calculated: 62° to 78°
- Dispersion: Strong

Riebeckite is a sodium-rich member of the amphibole group of silicate minerals. It has chemical formula Na_{2}(Fe^{2+}_{3}Fe^{3+}_{2})Si_{8}O_{22}(OH)_{2}. It forms a solid solution series with magnesioriebeckite, where Mg substitutes for Fe^{2+}. It crystallizes in the monoclinic system, usually as long prismatic crystals showing a diamond-shaped cross section, but also in fibrous, bladed, acicular, columnar, and radiating forms. Its Mohs hardness is 5.0–6.0, and its specific gravity is 3.0–3.4. It has perfect cleavage in two directions in the shape of a rhombus, while its fracture is uneven and splintery. It is often translucent to nearly opaque.

== Name and discovery ==
Riebeckite was first described in 1888 for an occurrence on Socotra Island, Aden Governorate, Yemen, and named for German explorer Emil Riebeck (1853–1885).

== Occurrence ==
Riebeckite typically forms dark-blue elongated to fibrous crystals in highly alkali granites and syenites. It forms more rarely in felsic volcanics, granite pegmatites and schist. It occurs in banded iron formations as the asbestiform variety crocidolite (blue asbestos). It occurs in association with aegirine, nepheline, albite, arfvedsonite in igneous rocks; with tremolite, ferro-actinolite in metamorphic rocks; and with grunerite, magnetite, hematite, stilpnomelane, ankerite, siderite, calcite, chalcedonic quartz in iron formations.

== Riebeckite granite ==
The riebeckite granite known as ailsite, found on the island of Ailsa Craig in western Scotland, is prized for its use in the manufacture of curling stones.

Riebeckite granite was used for the facing stones of the Canton Viaduct from Moyles Quarry (a.k.a. Canton Viaduct Quarry), now part of Borderland State Park in the US state of Massachusetts. The commonwealth's name is taken from an Algonquian word for the Great Blue Hill, whose color is due to this form of granite.

== Crocidolite (fibrous riebeckite) ==
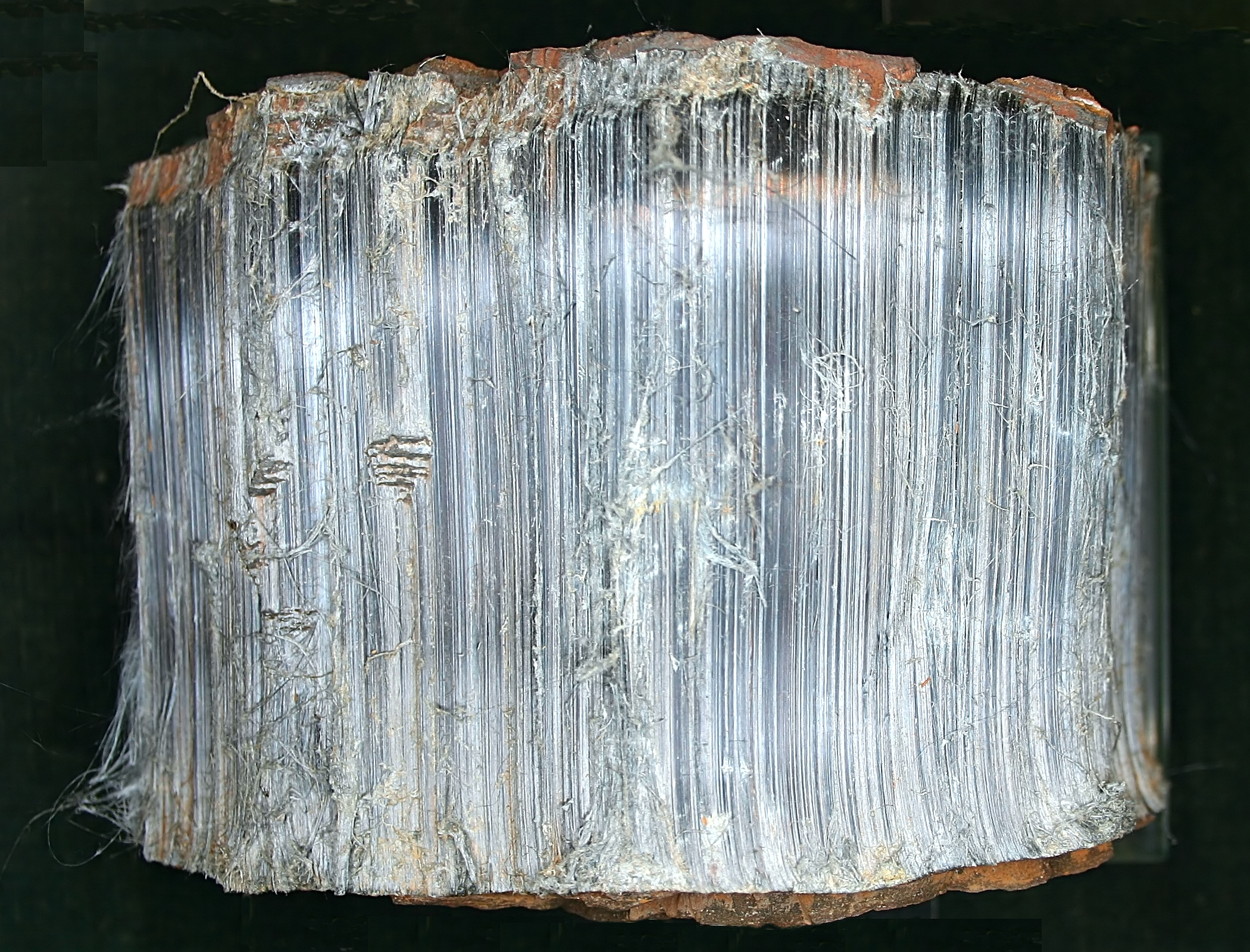
Crocidolite, variety of riebeckite, from Pomfret Mine, Vryburg, South Africa

The fibrous forms of riebeckite are known as crocidolite and are one of the six recognised types of asbestos. Often referred to as blue asbestos, it is considered the most hazardous. The association between blue asbestos and mesothelioma was established by J. C. Wagner, C. A. Sleggs, and P. Marchand by 1960.

Crocidolite asbestos was mined in South Africa, Bolivia, and Wittenoom, Western Australia. Bolivian crocidolite was used in approximately 13 billion Kent Micronite cigarette filters, manufactured from March 1952 until at least May 1956 by the Lorillard Tobacco Company (now part of the R. J. Reynolds Tobacco Company). Blue asbestos was also used to similar effect, and hazard, in early gas masks.

== See also ==
- List of minerals
- List of minerals named after people
