= Anthophyllite =

Silicate amphibole mineral

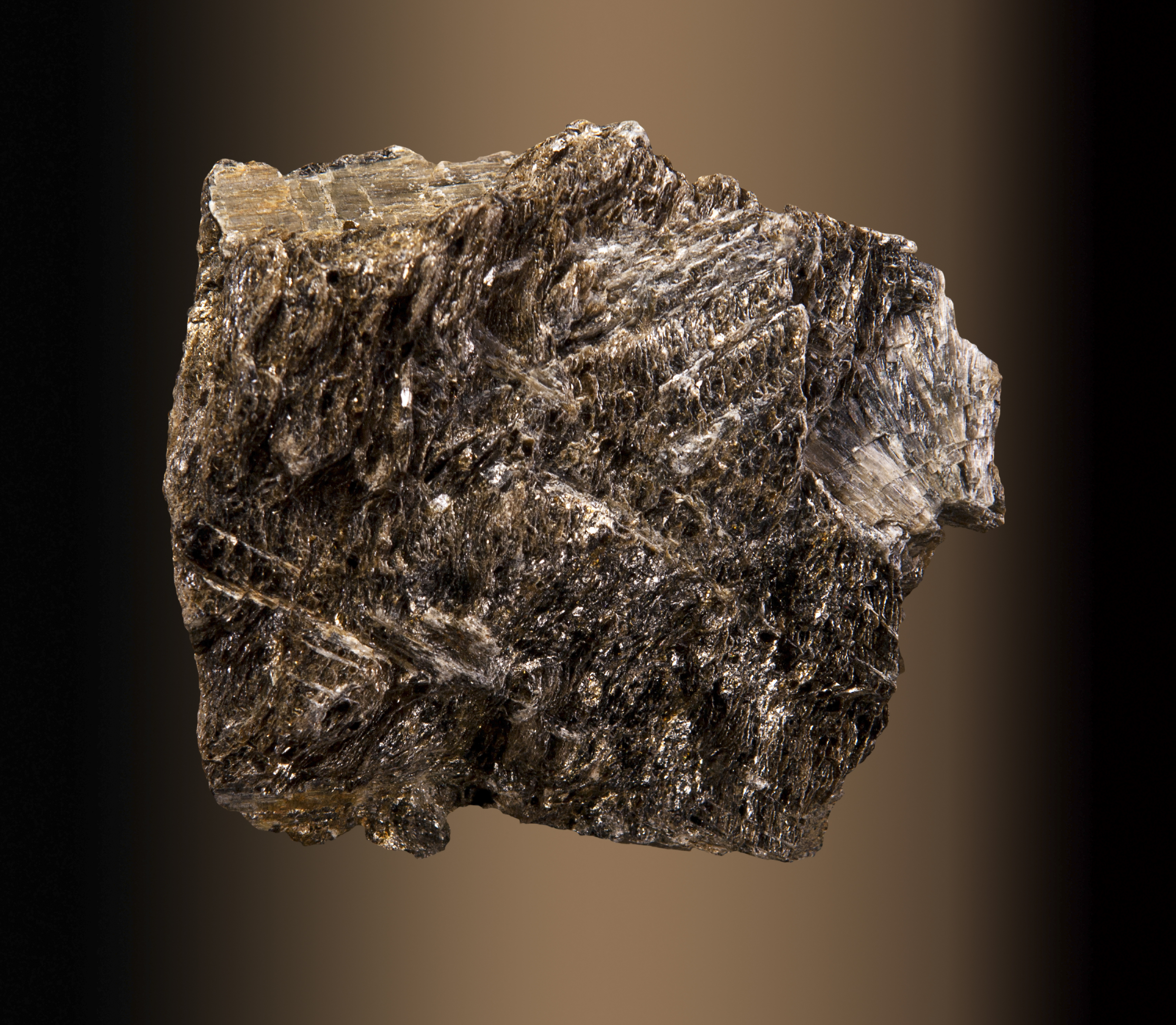

General
- Category: Inosilicates; Amphibole
- Formula: ☐Mg_{2}Mg_{5}Si_{8}O_{22}(OH)_{2}
- IMA symbol: Ath
- Strunz classification: 9.DE.05
- Crystal system: Orthorhombic
- Crystal class: Dipyramidal (mmm); H-M symbol: (2/m 2/m 2/m)
- Space group: Pnma
- Unit cell: a = 18.5, b = 17.9 c = 5.28 [Å]; Z = 4

Identification
- Color: Gray to green, brown, and beige
- Crystal habit: Rarely as distinct crystals. Commonly lamellar or fibrous.
- Cleavage: Perfect on {210}, imperfect on {010}, {100}
- Tenacity: Brittle; elastic when fibrous
- Mohs scale hardness: 5.5 – 6
- Luster: Vitreous, pearly on cleavage
- Streak: White to gray
- Diaphaneity: Transparent to translucent
- Specific gravity: 2.85 – 3.2
- Optical properties: Biaxial (+)
- Refractive index: n_{α}=1.598 – 1.674, n_{β}=1.605 – 1.685, n_{γ}=1.615 – 1.697; indices increase with Fe content
- Birefringence: δ = 0.017 – 0.023
- 2V angle: 57° - 90°
- Diagnostic features: Characterized by clove brown color, but unless in crystals, difficult to distinguish from other amphiboles without optical and/or X-ray tests

Anthophyllite is an orthorhombic amphibole mineral: ☐Mg_{2}Mg_{5}Si_{8}O_{22}(OH)_{2} (☐ is for a vacancy, a point defect in the crystal structure), magnesium iron inosilicate hydroxide. Anthophyllite is polymorphic with cummingtonite. Some forms of anthophyllite are lamellar or fibrous and are classed as asbestos. The name is derived from the Latin word anthophyllum, meaning clove, an allusion to the most common color of the mineral. The Anthophyllite crystal is characterized by its perfect cleavage along directions 126 degrees and 54 degrees.

== Occurrence ==
Anthophyllite is the product of metamorphism of magnesium-rich rocks, especially ultrabasic igneous rocks and impure dolomitic shales. It also forms as a retrograde product rimming relict orthopyroxenes and olivine, and as an accessory mineral in cordierite-bearing gneisses and schists. Anthophyllite also occurs as a retrograde metamorphic mineral derived from ultramafic rocks along with serpentinite.

== Occurrence in ultramafic rocks ==
Anthophyllite is formed by the breakdown of talc in ultramafic rocks in the presence of water and carbon dioxide as a prograde metamorphic reaction. The partial pressure of carbon dioxide (XCO_{2}) in aqueous solution favors production of anthophyllite. Higher partial pressures of CO_{2} reduces the temperature of the anthophyllite-in isograd.

Ultramafic rocks in purely hydrous, CO_{2}-free environments will tend to form serpentinite-antigorite-brucite-tremolite assemblages (dependent on MgO content) or at amphibolite to granulite metamorphic grade, metamorphic pyroxene or olivine. Thus, metamorphic assemblages of ultramafic rocks containing anthophyllite are indicative of at least greenschist facies metamorphism in the presence of carbon dioxide bearing metamorphic fluids.

The typical metamorphic assemblage reactions for low-magnesian (<25% MgO) and high-magnesian (>25% MgO) ultramafic rocks are;

- Olivine + Tremolite + Talc → Olivine + Tremolite + Anthophyllite (low MgO, >550 °C, XCO2 <0.6)
- Talc + Tremolite + Magnesite → Tremolite + Anthophyllite + Magnesite (High MgO, >500 °C, XCO2 >0.6)
- Talc + Magnesite + Tremolite → Anthophyllite + Tremolite + Magnesite (Low MgO, >500 °C, XCO2 >0.6)

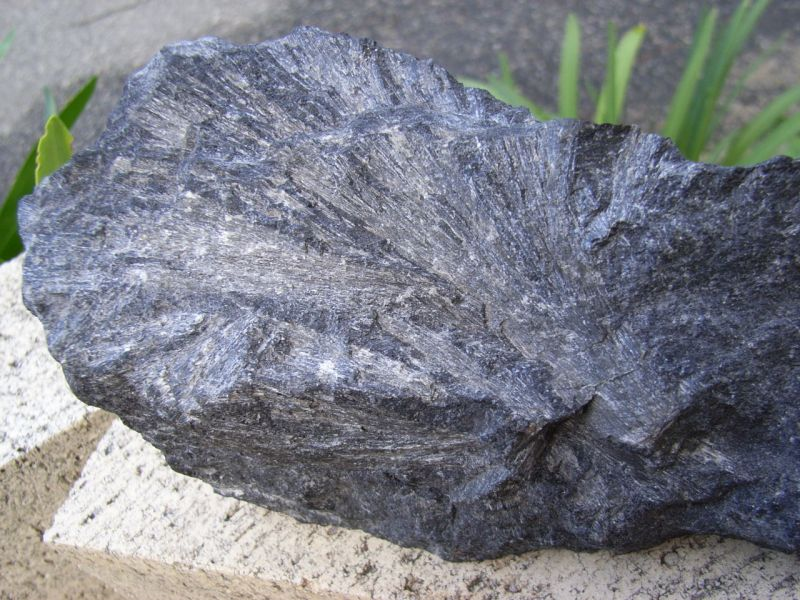
Anthophyllite in serpentinised komatiite, Maggie Hays Ni Mine, Western Australia

Retrogressive anthophyllite is relatively rare in ultramafic rocks and is usually poorly developed due to the lower energy state available for metamorphic reactions to progress and also the general dehydration of rock masses during metamorphism. Similarly, the need for substantial components of carbon dioxide in metamorphic fluid restricts the appearance of anthophyllite as a retrograde mineral. The usual metamorphic assemblage of retrograde-altered ultramafic rocks is thus usually a serpentinite or talc-magnesite assemblage.

Retrograde anthophyllite is present most usually in shear zones where fracturing and shearing of the rocks provides a conduit for carbonated fluids during retrogression.

== Fibrous anthophyllite ==
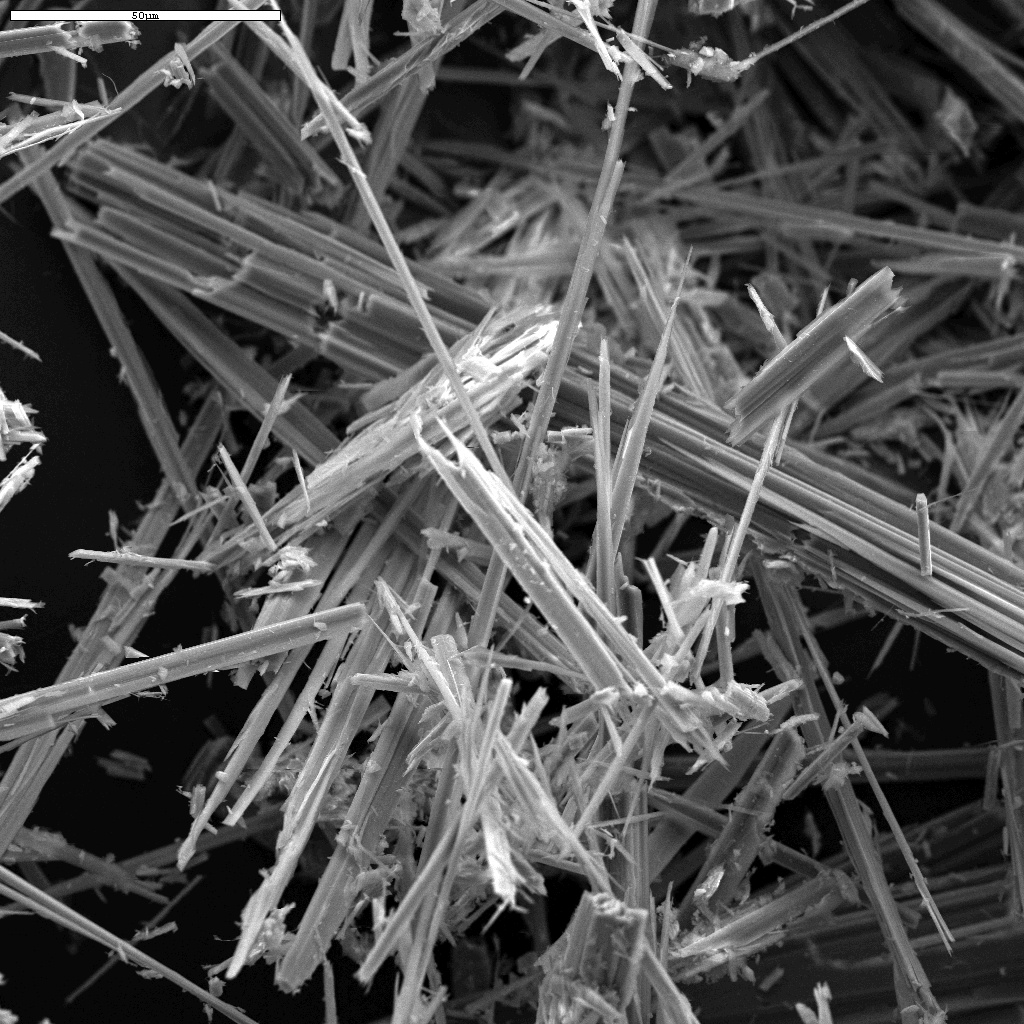
Anthophyllite fibers (SEM micrograph)

Fibrous anthophyllite is one of the six recognised types of asbestos. It was mined in Finland and also in Matsubase, Japan where a large-scale open-cast asbestos mine and mill was in operation between 1883 and 1970.

In Finland anthophyllite asbestos was mined in two mines, the larger one Paakkila in the Tuusniemi commune started in 1918 and closed in 1975 due to the dust problems. The smaller mine, Maljasalmi in the commune of Outokumpu, was mined from 1944 to 1952. The anthophyllite was used in asbestos cement and for insulation, roofing material etc.

Anthophyllite is also known as azbolen asbestos.
