= Amphibole =

Group of inosilicate minerals

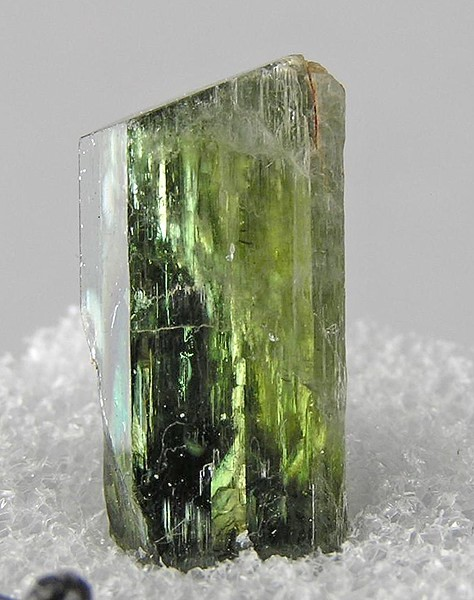
Amphibole (tremolite)

Amphibole (/ˈæmfəboʊl/ AM-fə-bohl) is a group of inosilicate minerals, forming prism or needlelike crystals, composed of double chain SiO_{4} tetrahedra, linked at the vertices and generally containing ions of iron and/or magnesium in their structures. Its IMA symbol is Amp. Amphiboles can be green, black, colorless, white, yellow, blue, or brown. The International Mineralogical Association currently classifies amphiboles as a mineral supergroup, within which are two groups and several subgroups.

== Mineralogy ==
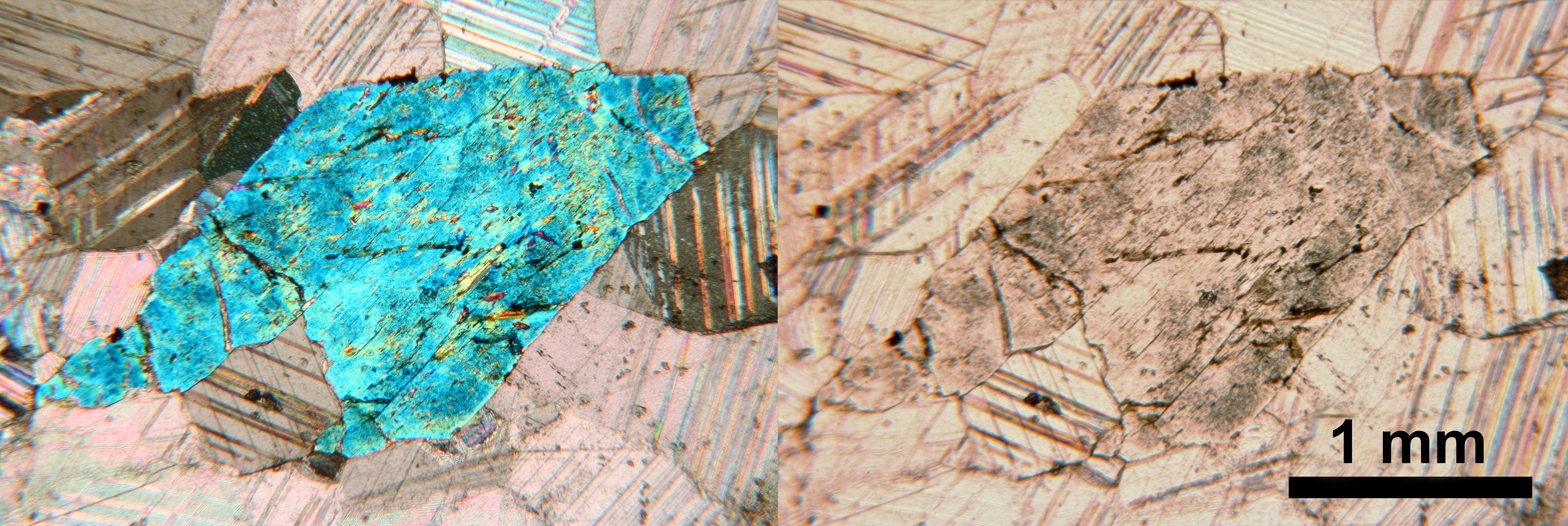
Photomicrographs of a thin section containing an amphibole crystal; under cross-polarized light on the left, and plane-polarized light on the right.

Amphiboles crystallize into two crystal systems, monoclinic and orthorhombic. In chemical composition and general characteristics they are similar to the pyroxenes. The chief differences from pyroxenes are that (i) amphiboles contain essential hydroxyl (OH) or halogen (F, Cl) and (ii) the basic structure is a double chain of tetrahedra (as opposed to the single chain structure of pyroxene). Most apparent, in hand specimens, is that amphiboles form oblique cleavage planes (at around 120 degrees), whereas pyroxenes have cleavage angles of approximately 90 degrees. Amphiboles are also specifically less dense than the corresponding pyroxenes. Amphiboles are the primary constituent of amphibolites.

=== Structure ===
Like pyroxenes, amphiboles are classified as inosilicate (chain silicate) minerals. However, the pyroxene structure is built around single chains of silica tetrahedra while amphiboles are built around double chains of silica tetrahedra. In other words, as with almost all silicate minerals, each silicon ion is surrounded by four oxygen ions. In amphiboles, some of the oxygen ions are shared between silicon ions to form a double chain structure as depicted below. These chains extend along the [001] axis of the crystal. One side of each chain has apical oxygen ions, shared by only one silicon ion, and pairs of double chains are bound to each other by metal ions that connect apical oxygen ions. The pairs of double chains have been likened to I-beams. Each I-beam is bonded to its neighbor by additional metal ions to form the complete crystal structure. Large gaps in the structure may be empty or partially filled by large metal ions, such as sodium, but remain points of weakness that help define the cleavage planes of the crystal.

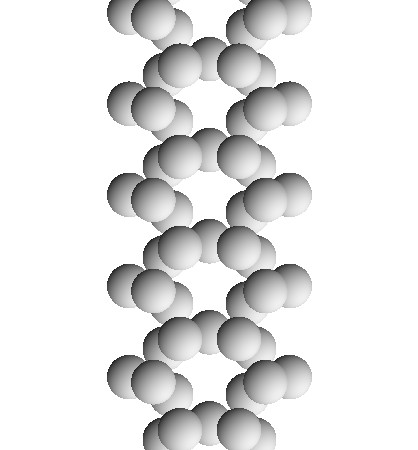
Double-chain inosilicate structure looking up the [100] axis. Silicon ions are hidden by apical oxygen ions.

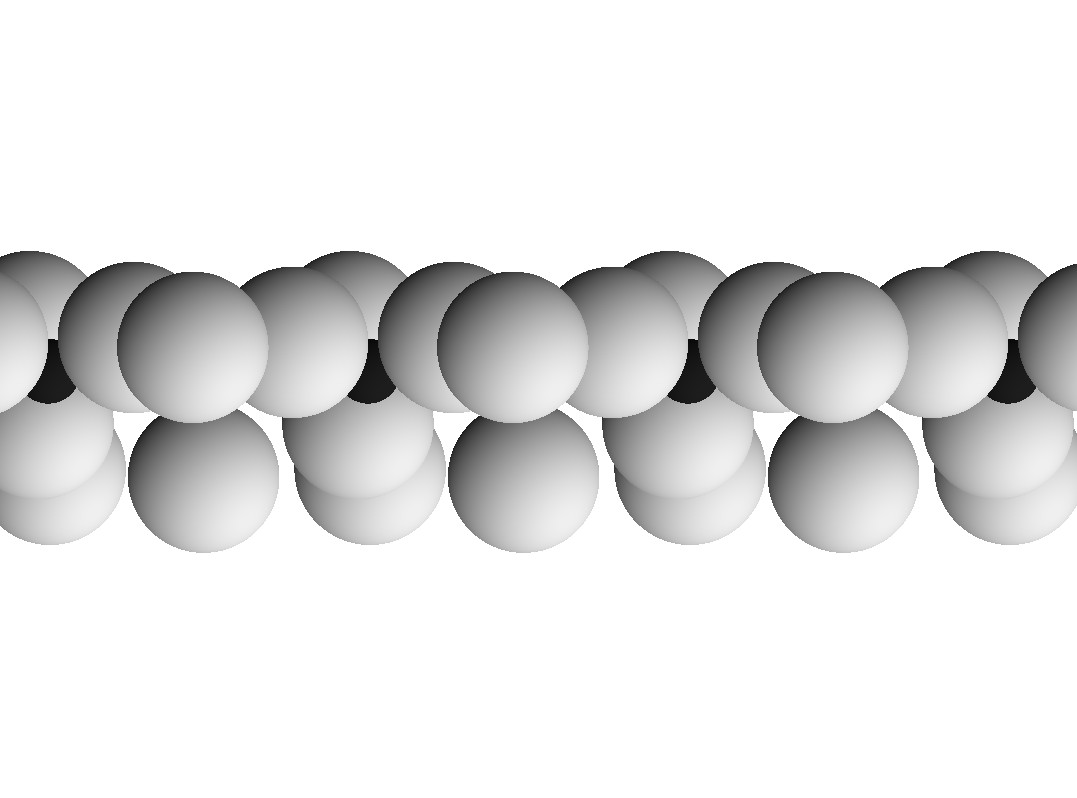
Side view (along [010]) of double chain inosilicate backbone. Apical oxygens are at the bottom.

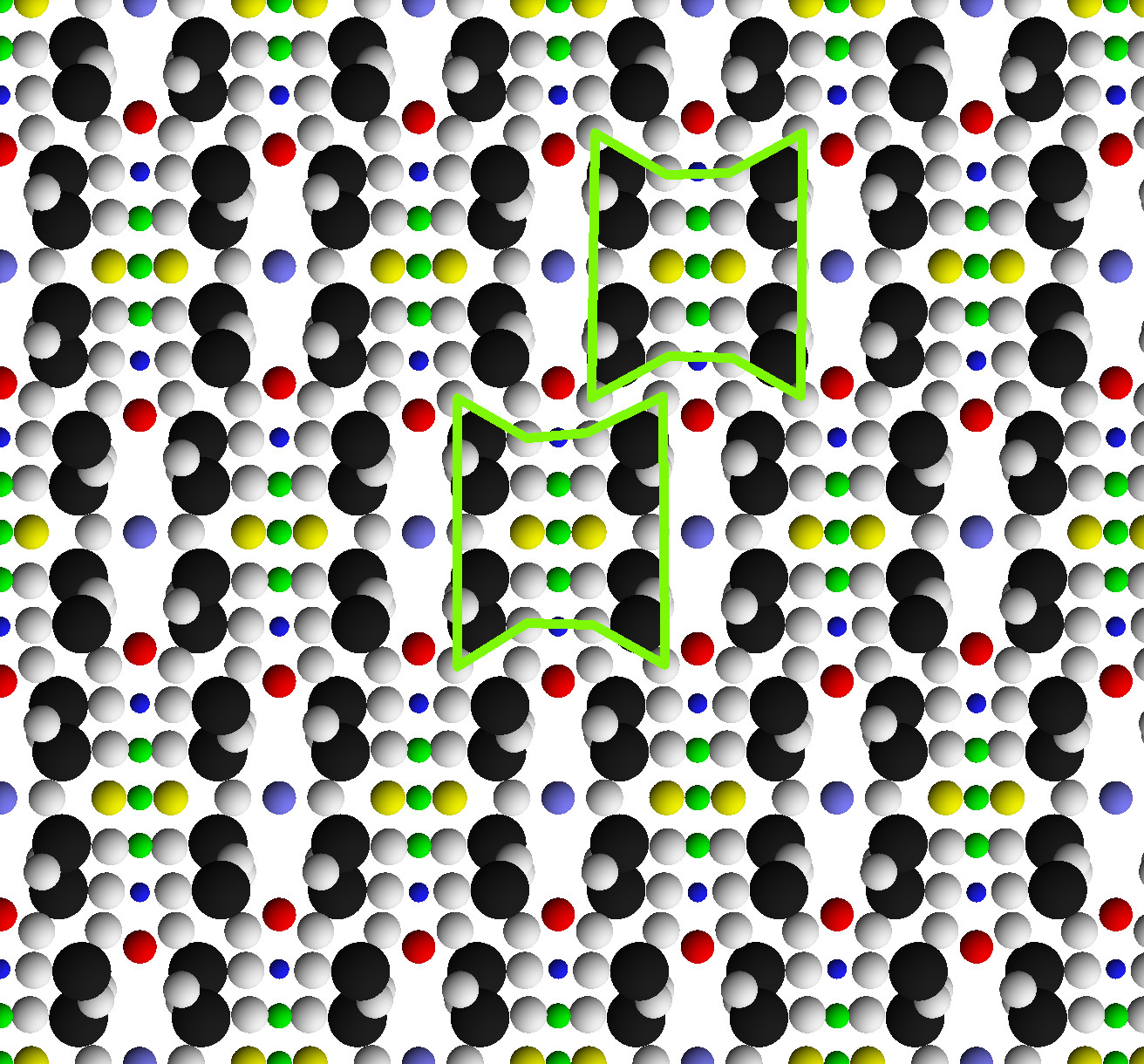
Amphibole structure looking along the [001] axis. Silicon ions are emphasized. Two "I-beams" are outlined in green.

=== In rocks ===
Mineral assemblage of igneous rocks

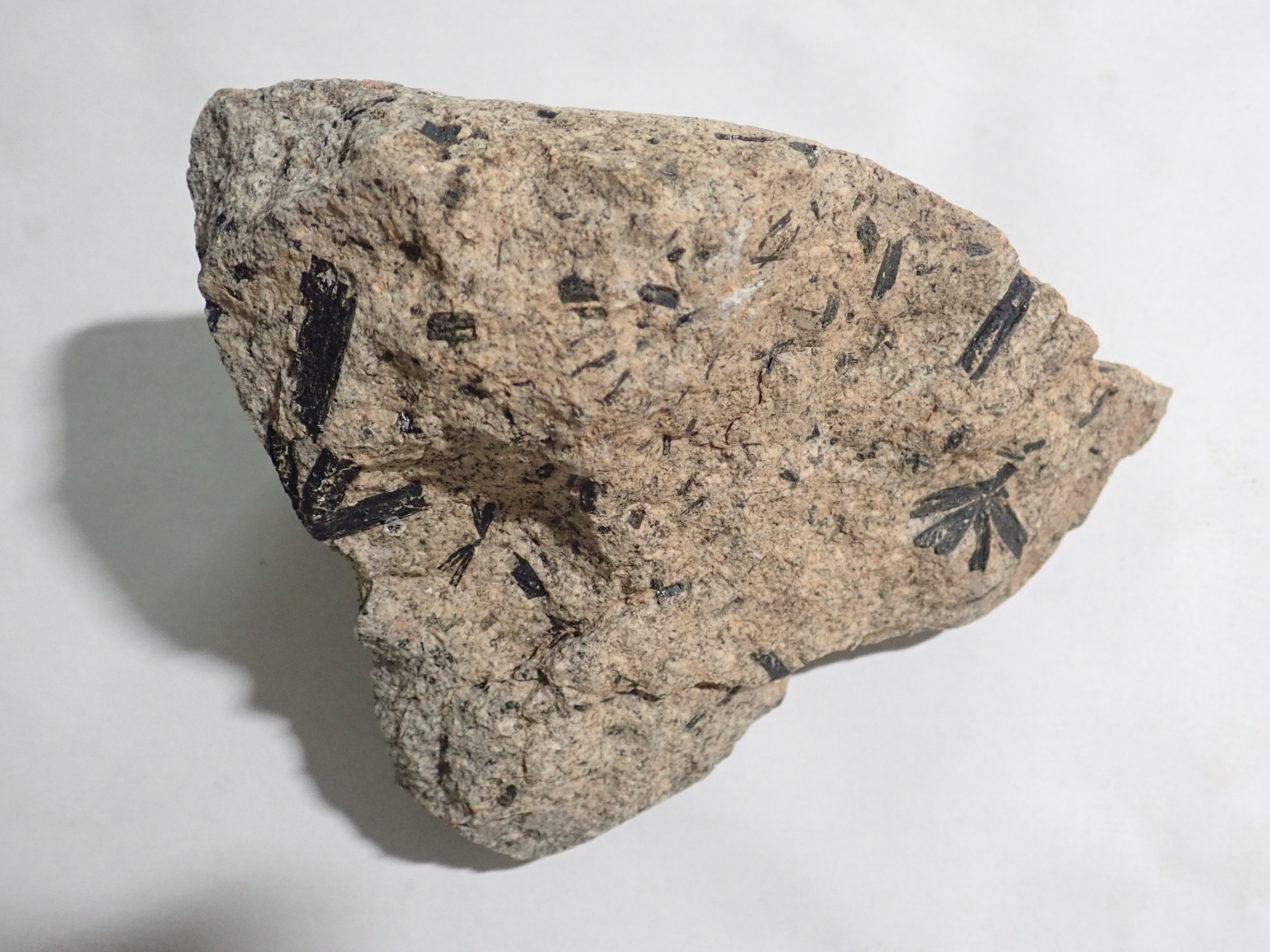
Hornblende diorite from the Henry Mountains, Utah, US

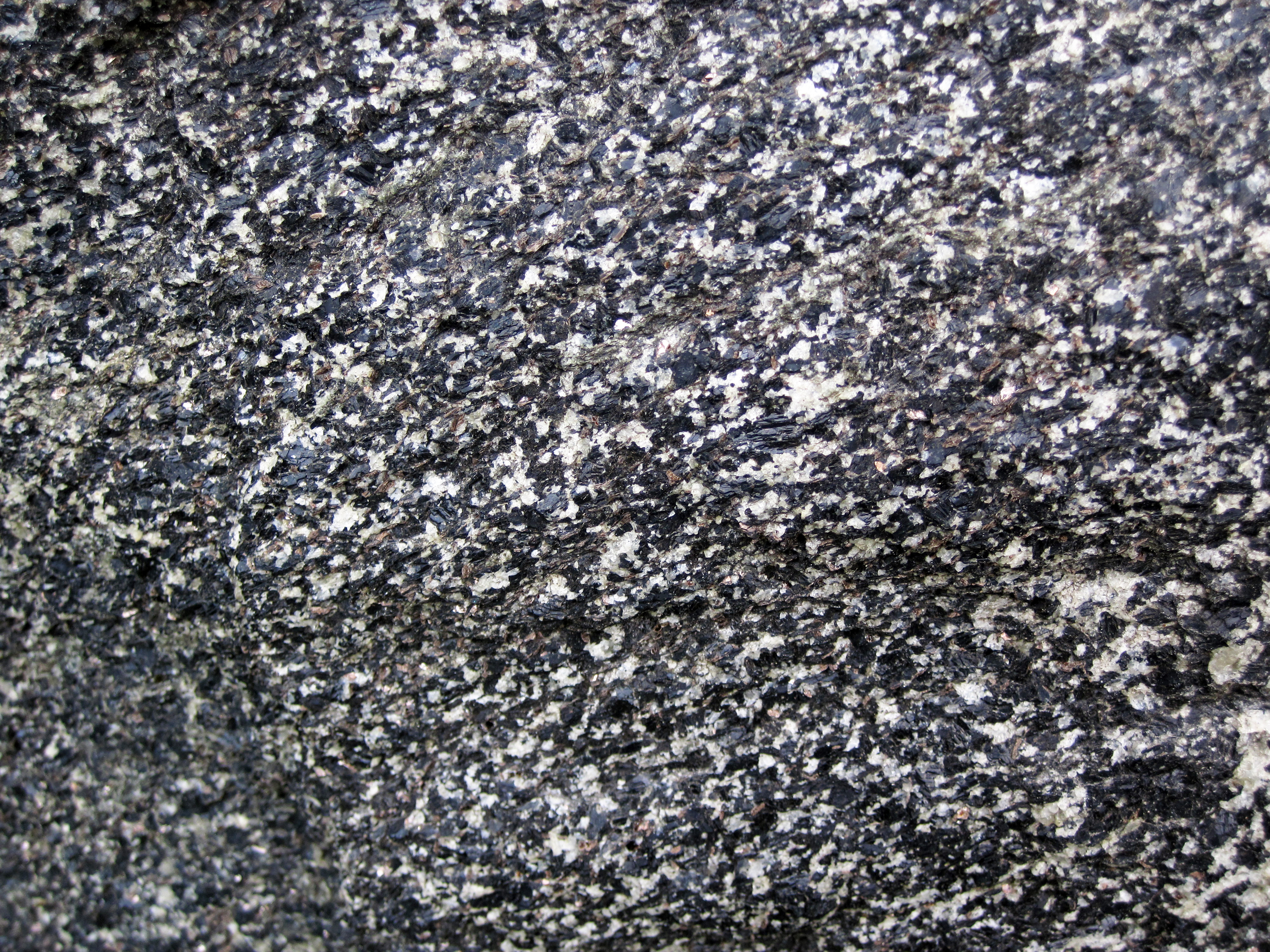
Amphibolite from Warrensburg, Adirondack Mountains, New York State, USA

Amphiboles are minerals of either igneous or metamorphic origin. Amphiboles are more common in intermediate to felsic igneous rocks than in mafic igneous rocks, because the higher silica and dissolved water content of the more evolved magmas favors formation of amphiboles rather than pyroxenes. The highest amphibole content, around 20%, is found in andesites. Hornblende is widespread in igneous and metamorphic rocks and is particularly common in syenites and diorites. Calcium is sometimes a constituent of naturally occurring amphiboles. Amphiboles of metamorphic origin include those developed in limestones by contact metamorphism (tremolite) and those formed by the alteration of other ferromagnesian minerals (such as hornblende as an alteration product of pyroxene). Pseudomorphs of amphibole after pyroxene are known as uralite.

== History and etymology ==
The name amphibole derives from Greek amphíbolos (ἀμφίβολος, lit. 'double entendre'), implying ambiguity. The name was used by René Just Haüy to include tremolite, actinolite and hornblende. The group was so named by Haüy in allusion to the protean variety, in composition and appearance, assumed by its minerals. This term has since been applied to the whole group. Numerous sub-species and varieties are distinguished, the more important of which are tabulated below in two series. The formulae of each will be seen to be built on the general double-chain silicate formula RSi_{4}O_{11}.

Four of the amphibole minerals are commonly called asbestos. These are: anthophyllite, riebeckite, the cummingtonite/grunerite series, and the actinolite/tremolite series. The cummingtonite/grunerite series is often termed amosite or "brown asbestos", and riebeckite is known as crocidolite or "blue asbestos". These are generally called amphibole asbestos. Mining, manufacture and prolonged use of these minerals can cause serious illnesses.

== Mineral species ==
The more common amphiboles are classified as shown in the following table:

Amphibole classification (After Nesse 2000)
Group	W	X_{2}	Y_{5}	Z_{8}O_{22}(OH)_{2}	Mineral	Symmetry	Comment
Iron-magnesium		(Mg,Fe)_{2}	(Mg,Fe)_{5}	Si_{8}O_{22}(OH)_{2}	Anthophyllite	Orthorhombic	Orthoamphibolite
Iron-magnesium		(Mg,Fe)_{2}	(Mg,Fe)_{3}Al_{2}	Al_{2}Si_{6}O_{22}(OH)_{2}	Gedrite	Orthorhombic	Orthoamphibolite
Iron-magnesium		(Mg,Fe)_{2}	(Mg,Fe)_{5}	Si_{8}O_{22}(OH)_{2}	Cummingtonite-Grunerite	Monoclinic	Low-Ca-clinoamphibolite
Calcic		Ca_{2}	(Mg,Fe)_{5}	Si_{8}O_{22}(OH)_{2}	Tremolite-actinolite	Monoclinic	Ca-clinoamphibole
Calcic	(Na,K)_{0−1}	Ca_{2}	(Mg,Fe,Fe^{3+},Al)_{5}	(Si,Al)_{8}O_{22}(OH)_{2}	Hornblende	Monoclinic	Ca-clinoamphibole
Calcic	Na	Ca_{2}	(Mg,Fe)_{4}Ti	Si_{6}Al_{2}O_{22}(OH)_{2}	Kaersutite	Monoclinic	Ca-clinoamphibole
Sodic-calcic	Na	NaCa	(Mg,Fe)_{5}	Si_{8}O_{22}(OH)_{2}	Richterite	Monoclinic	Na-Ca-clinonamphibole
Sodic-calcic	Na	NaCa	(Mg,Fe)_{4}Fe^{3+}	Si_{7}AlO_{22}(OH)_{2}	Katophorite	Monoclinic	Na-Ca-clinonamphibole
Sodic		Na_{2}	(Mg,Fe)_{3}(Al,Fe^{3+})_{2}	Si_{8}O_{22}(OH)_{2}	Glaucophane-riebeckite	Monoclinic	Na-clinoamphibole
Sodic	Na	Na_{2}	(Mg,Fe)_{4}(Al,Fe^{3+})	Si_{8}O_{22}(OH)_{2}	Eckermanite-arfvedsonite	Monoclinic	Na-clinoamphibole

=== Other species ===
Orthorhombic series

- Holmquistite, Li_{2}Mg_{3}Al_{2}Si_{8}O_{22}(OH)_{2}

Monoclinic series

- Pargasite, NaCa_{2}Mg_{3}Fe^{2+}Si_{6}Al_{3}O_{22}(OH)_{2}
- Winchite, (CaNa)Mg_{4}(Al,Fe^{3+})Si_{8}O_{22}(OH)_{2}
- Edenite, NaCa_{2}Mg_{5}(Si_{7}Al)O_{22}(OH)_{2}

=== Series ===
Certain amphibole minerals form solid solution series, at least at elevated temperature. Ferrous iron usually substitutes freely for magnesium in amphiboles to form continuous solid solution series between magnesium-rich and iron-rich endmembers. These include the cummington (magnesium) to grunerite (iron) endmembers, where the dividing line is placed at 30% magnesium.

In addition, the orthoamphiboles, anthophyllite and gedrite, which differ in their aluminium content, form a continuous solid solution at elevated temperature. As the amphibole cools, the two end members exsolve to form very thin layers (lamellae).

Hornblende is highly variable in composition, and includes at least five solid solution series: magnesiohornblende-ferrohornblende (Ca_{2}[(Mg,Fe)_{4}Al]Si_{7}AlO_{22}(OH)_{2}), tschermakite-ferrotschermakite (Ca_{2}[(Mg,Fe)_{3}Al_{2}]Si_{6}Al_{2}O_{22}(OH)_{2}), edenite-ferroedenite (NaCa_{2}(Mg,Fe)_{5}Si_{7}AlO_{22}(OH)_{2}), pargasite-ferropargasite (NaCa_{2}[(Mg,Fe)_{4}Al]Si_{6}Al_{2}O_{22}(OH)_{2}) and magnesiohastingstite-hastingsite (NaCa_{2}[(Mg,Fe)_{4}Fe^{3+}]Si_{6}Al_{2}O_{22}(OH)_{2}). In addition, titanium, manganese, or chromium can substitute for some of the cations and oxygen, fluorine, or chlorine for some of the hydroxide. The different chemical types are almost impossible to distinguish even by optical or X-ray methods, and detailed chemical analysis using an electron microprobe is required.

Glaucophane to riebeckite form yet another solid solution series, which also extends towards hornblende and arfvedsonite.

There is not a continuous series between calcic clinoamphiboles, such as hornblende, and low-calcium amphiboles, such as orthoamphiboles or the cummingtonite-grunerite series. Compositions intermediate in calcium are almost nonexistent in nature. However, there is a solid solution series between hornblende and tremolite-actinolite at elevated temperature. A miscibility gap exists at lower temperatures, and, as a result, hornblende often contains exsolution lamellae of grunerite.

=== Descriptions ===
On account of the wide variations in chemical composition, the different members vary considerably in properties and general appearance.

Anthophyllite occurs as brownish, fibrous or lamellar masses with hornblende in mica-schist at Kongsberg in Norway and some other localities. An aluminous related species is known as gedrite and a deep green Russian variety containing little iron as kupfferite.

Hornblende is an important constituent of many igneous rocks. It is also an important constituent of amphibolites formed by metamorphism of basalt.

Actinolite is an important and common member of the monoclinic series, forming radiating groups of acicular crystals of a bright green or greyish-green color. It occurs frequently as a constituent of greenschists. The name (from Greek ἀκτίς, ἀκτῖνος/aktís, aktînos, a 'ray' and λίθος/líthos, a 'stone') is a translation of the old German word Strahlstein (radiated stone).

Glaucophane, crocidolite, riebeckite and arfvedsonite form a somewhat special group of alkali-amphiboles. The first two are blue fibrous minerals, with glaucophane occurring in blueschists and crocidolite (blue asbestos) in ironstone formations, both resulting from dynamo-metamorphic processes. The latter two are dark green minerals, which occur as original constituents of igneous rocks rich in sodium, such as nepheline-syenite and phonolite.

Pargasite is a rare magnesium-rich variety of hornblende with essential sodium, usually found in ultramafic rocks. For instance, it occurs in uncommon mantle xenoliths, carried up by kimberlite. It is hard, dense, black and usually automorphic, with a red-brown pleochroism in petrographic thin section.

== See also ==
- List of minerals
- Classification of silicate minerals
