= Grunerite =

Mineral

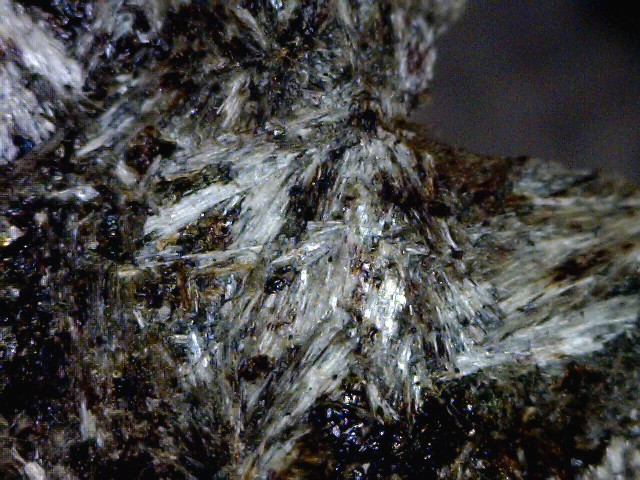
- Sprays of small, prismatic grunerite crystals on matrix, field of view 5mm, from Marquette Co., Michigan, US

General
- Category: Inosilicate
- Formula: Fe_{7}Si_{8}O_{22}(OH)_{2}
- IMA symbol: Gru
- Strunz classification: 9.DE.05
- Crystal system: Monoclinic
- Crystal class: Prismatic (2/m) (same H-M symbol)
- Space group: C2/m

Identification
- Formula mass: 1,001.61 g/mol
- Color: Ashen, brown, brownish green, dark gray
- Crystal habit: Columnar, acicular
- Mohs scale hardness: 5–6
- Luster: Vitreous
- Streak: Colorless
- Diaphaneity: Translucent to opaque
- Specific gravity: 3.45
- Density: 3.4–3.5
- Ultraviolet fluorescence: Non-fluorescent
- Other characteristics: Not radioactive

Grunerite is a mineral of the amphibole group of minerals with formula Fe_{7}Si_{8}O_{22}(OH)_{2}. It is the iron endmember of the grunerite-cummingtonite series. It forms as fibrous, columnar or massive aggregates of crystals. The crystals are monoclinic prismatic. The luster is glassy to pearly with colors ranging from green, brown to dark grey. The Mohs hardness is 5 to 6 and the specific gravity is 3.4 to 3.5.

It was discovered in 1853 and named after Emmanuel-Louis Gruner (1809–1883), the Swiss-French chemist who first analysed it.

== Amosite (fibrous grunerite) ==
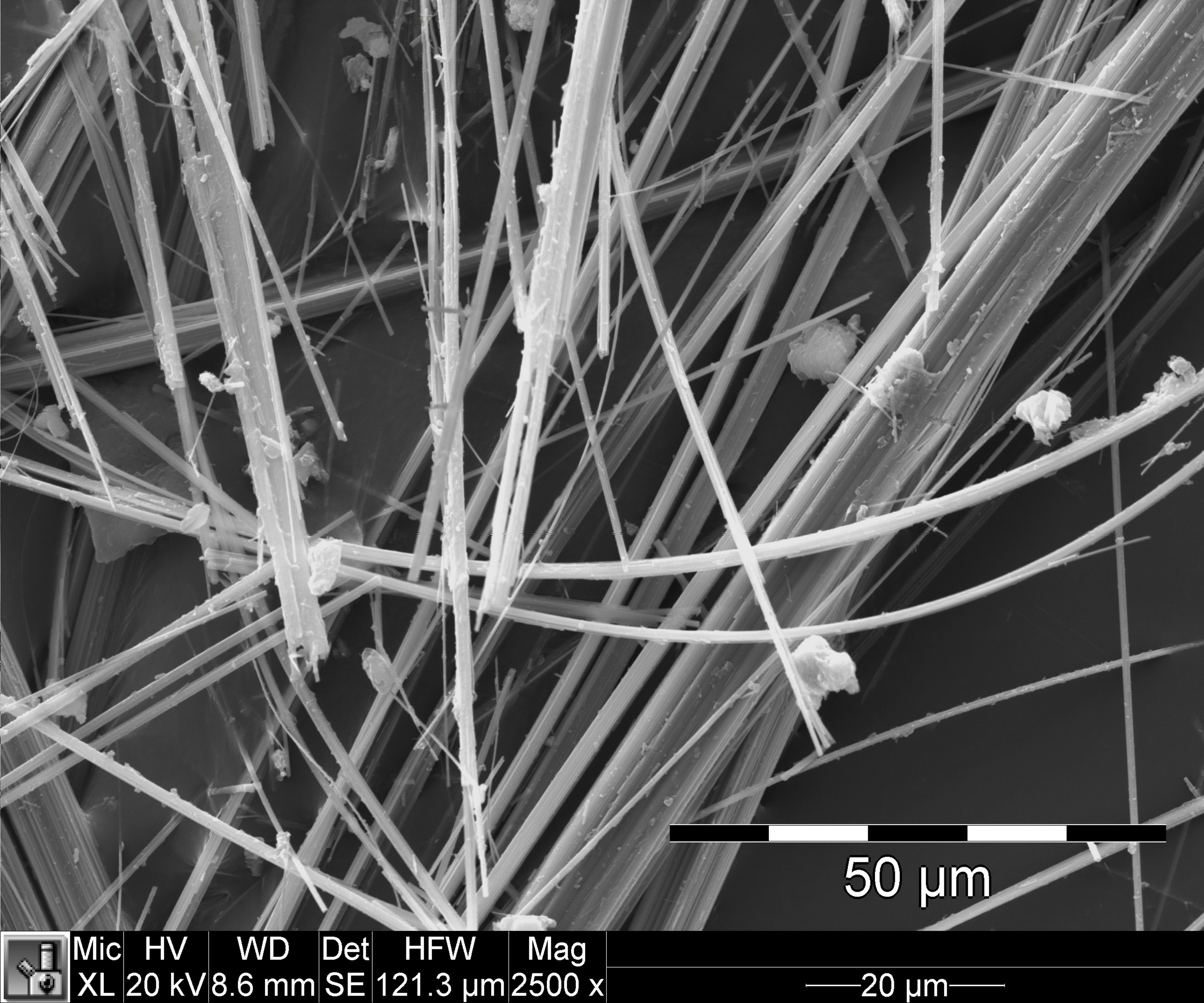
Scanning electron microscope image of asbestos fibres (grunerite var. amosite)

Amosite is a rare asbestiform variety of grunerite that was mined as asbestos predominantly in the eastern part of the Transvaal Province of South Africa. The origin of the name is Amosa, the acronym for the mining company "Asbestos Mines of South Africa". In industry Amosite is referred to as "brown asbestos".
