= Ferruginous =

The adjective ferruginous may mean:

- Containing iron, applied to water, oil, and other non-metals
- Having rust on the surface
- With the rust (color)

== See also ==
- Ferrous, containing iron (for metals and alloys) or iron(II) cations
- Ferric, containing iron(III) cations
- Ferrate, anions containing iron
- Ferruginous body, a nodule indicative of asbestos inhalation
- Ferruginea (disambiguation)
- List of birds described as ferruginous
