= Health impact of asbestos =

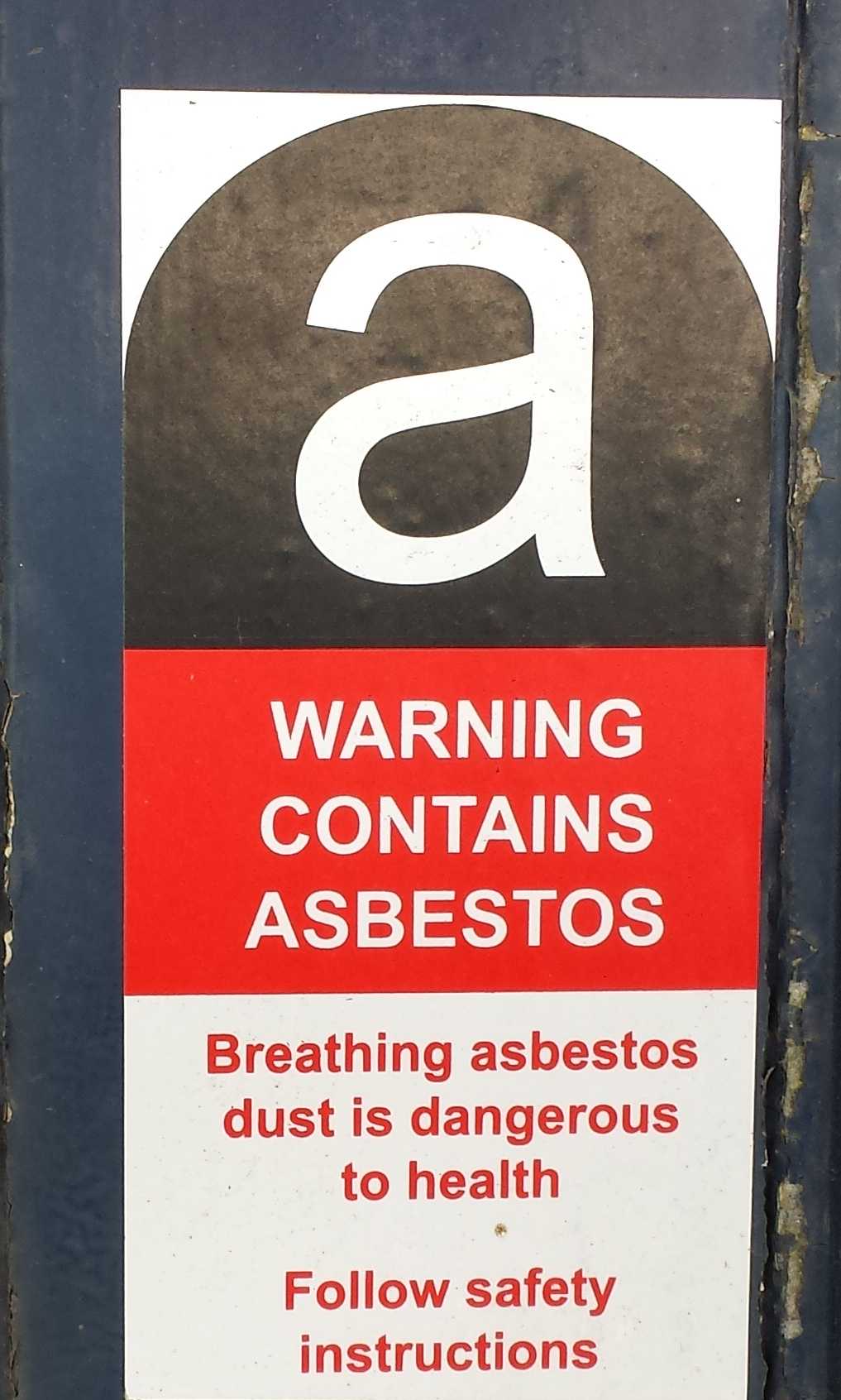
Asbestos warning label.

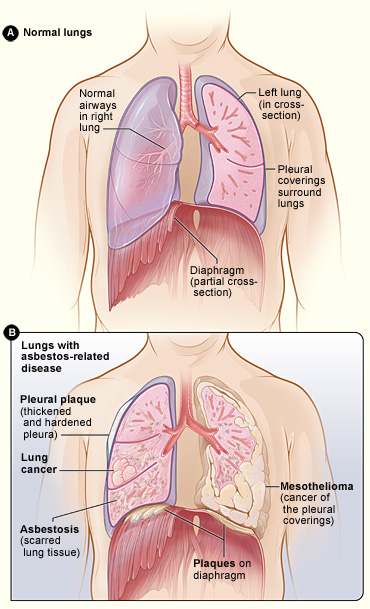
Figure A shows the location of the lungs, airways, pleura, and diaphragm in the body. Figure B shows lungs with asbestos-related diseases, including pleural plaque, lung cancer, asbestosis, plaque on the diaphragm, and mesothelioma.

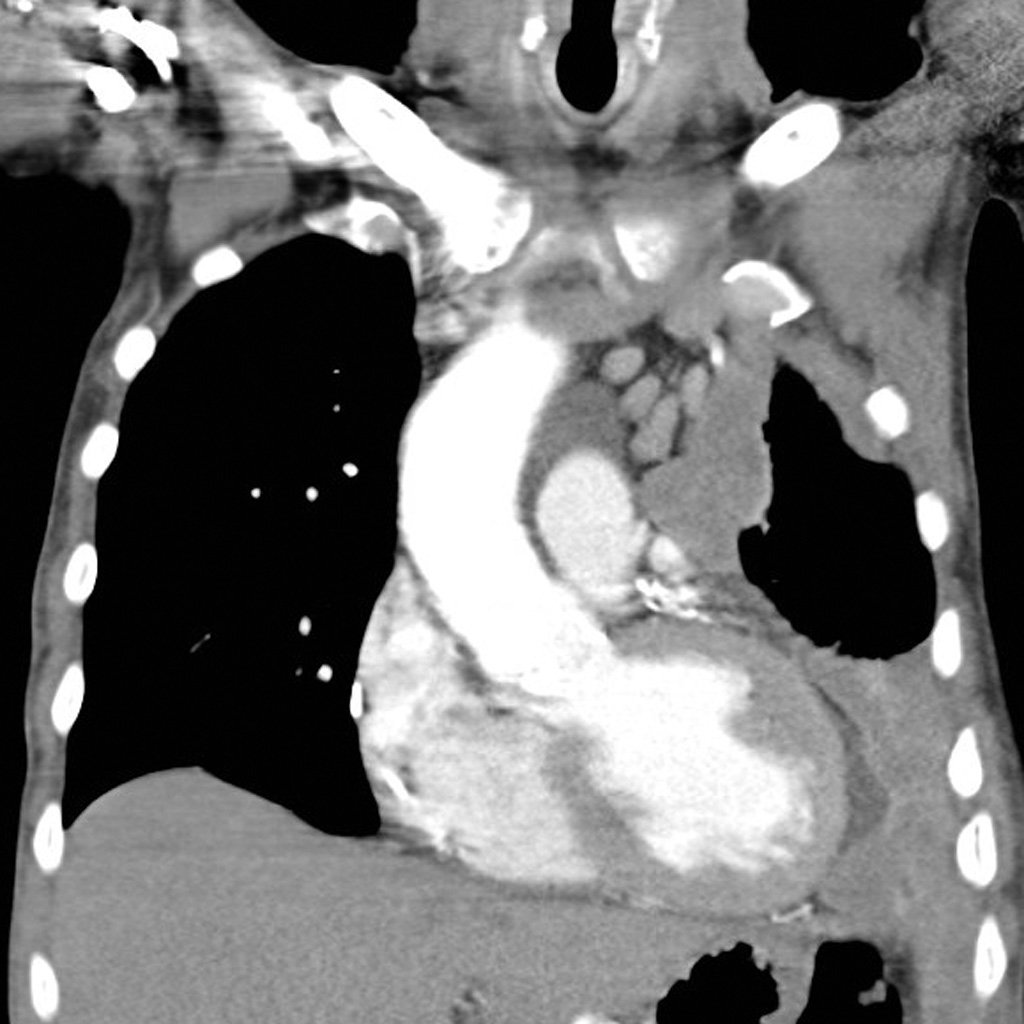
Left-sided mesothelioma (seen on the right of the picture): chest CT

All types of asbestos fibers are known to cause serious health hazards in humans. The most common diseases associated with chronic exposure to asbestos are asbestosis and mesothelioma.

Amosite and crocidolite are considered the most hazardous asbestos fiber types; however, chrysotile asbestos has also produced tumors in animals and is a recognized cause of asbestosis and malignant mesothelioma in humans, and mesothelioma has been observed in people who were occupationally exposed to chrysotile, family members of the occupationally exposed, and residents who lived close to asbestos factories and mines.

During the 1980s and again in the 1990s it was suggested at times that the process of making asbestos cement could "neutralize" the asbestos, either via chemical processes or by causing cement to attach to the fibers and changing their physical size; subsequent studies showed that this was untrue, and that decades-old asbestos cement, when broken, releases asbestos fibers identical to those found in nature, with no detectable alteration.

== Risks ==
Exposure to asbestos in the form of fibers is always considered dangerous. Working with, or exposure to, material that is friable, or materials or works that could cause release of loose asbestos fibers, is considered high risk. However, in general, people who become ill from inhaling asbestos have been regularly exposed in a job where they worked directly with the material.

According to the National Cancer Institute, "A history of asbestos exposure at work is reported in about 70 percent to 80 percent of all cases. However, mesothelioma has been reported in some individuals without any known exposure to asbestos." A paper published in 1998, in the American Journal of Respiratory and Critical Care Medicine, concurs, and comments that asbestosis has been reported primarily in asbestos workers, and appears to require long-term exposure, high concentration for the development of the clinical disease. There is also a long latency period (the time taken between harmful contact and emergence of the actual resulting illness) of about 12 to 20 years, and potentially up to 40 years.

The most common diseases associated with chronic exposure to asbestos are asbestosis and mesothelioma.

According to OSHA, "there is no 'safe' level of asbestos exposure for any type of asbestos fiber. Asbestos exposures as short in duration as a few days have caused mesothelioma in humans. Every occupational exposure to asbestos can cause injury or disease; every occupational exposure to asbestos contributes to the risk of getting an asbestos related disease."

=== Asbestos-related diseases ===
Diseases commonly associated with asbestos include:

- Asbestosis: Progressive fibrosis of the lungs of varying severity, progressing to bilateral fibrosis, honeycombing of the lungs on radiological view with symptoms including rales and wheezing. Individuals who have been exposed to asbestos via home, environment, or work should notify their doctors about exposure history.
- Asbestos warts: caused when the sharp fibers lodge in the skin and are overgrown causing benign callus-like growths.
- Pleural plaques: discrete fibrous or partially calcified thickened area which can be seen on X-rays of individuals exposed to asbestos. Although pleural plaques are themselves asymptomatic, in some patients this develops into pleural thickening.
- Diffuse pleural thickening: similar to above and can sometimes be associated with asbestosis. Usually no symptoms shown but if exposure is extensive, it can cause lung impairment.
- Pneumothorax: Some reports have also linked the condition of pneumothorax to asbestos related diseases.
- Malignant mesothelioma: an aggressive and incurable tumour arising from mesothelial cells of the pleura (the lining of the thoracic cavity).

== Safety and exposure prevention ==
Asbestos exposure becomes an issue if asbestos containing materials become airborne, such as due to deterioration or damage. Building occupants may be exposed to asbestos, but those most at risk are persons who purposely disturb materials, such as maintenance or construction workers. Housekeeping or custodial employees may be at an increased risk as they may potentially clean up damaged or deteriorated asbestos containing materials without knowing that the material contains asbestos. Asbestos abatement or remediation workers and emergency personnel such as firefighters may also become exposed. Asbestos-related diseases have been diagnosed in asbestos workers' family members, and in residents who live close to asbestos mines or processing plants.

=== Common building materials containing asbestos ===
Currently in the United States, several thousand products manufactured and/or imported today still contain asbestos. In many parts of the industrialized world, particularly the European Union, asbestos was phased out of building products beginning in the 1970s with most of the remainder phased out by the 1980s. Even with an asbestos ban in place, however, asbestos may be found in many buildings that were built and/or renovated from the late 1800s through the present day.

Residential building materials containing asbestos include a variety of products, such as: stipple used in textured walls and ceilings; drywall joint filler compound; asbestos contaminated vermiculite, vinyl floor tile; vinyl sheet flooring; window putty; mastic; cement board; asbestos cement pipes and flues; furnace tape; and stucco. Asbestos is widely used in roofing materials, mainly corrugated asbestos cement roof sheets and asbestos shingles sometimes called transite. Other sources of asbestos-containing materials include fireproofing and acoustic materials.

=== Identification and assessment ===
A fiber cannot be identified or ruled out as asbestos, either using the naked eye or by simply looking at a fiber under a regular microscope. The most common methods of identifying asbestos fibers are by using polarized light microscopy (PLM) or transmission electron microscopy (TEM). PLM is less expensive, but TEM is more precise and can be used at lower concentrations of asbestos.

If asbestos abatement is performed, completion of the abatement is verified using visual confirmation and may also involve air sampling. Air samples are typically analyzed using phase contrast microscopy (PCM). PCM involves counting fibers on a filter using a microscope. Airborne occupational exposure limits for asbestos are based on using the PCM method.

The American Conference of Governmental Industrial Hygienists has a recommended Threshold Limit Value (TLV) for asbestos of 0.1 fibers/mL over an 8-hour shift. OSHA in the United States and occupational health and safety regulatory jurisdictions in Canada use 0.1 fibers/mL over an 8-hour shift as their exposure limits.

=== Environmental asbestos ===
Asbestos can be found naturally in the air outdoors and in some drinkable water, including water from natural sources. Even nonoccupationally exposed members of the human population have tens to hundreds of thousands of asbestos fibers per gram of dry lung tissue, equivalent to millions of fibers in each lung.

Asbestos from natural geologic deposits is known as "naturally occurring asbestos" (NOA). Health risks associated with exposure to NOA are not yet fully understood, and current US federal regulations do not address exposure from NOA. Many populated areas are in proximity to shallow, natural deposits which occur in 50 of 58 California counties and in 19 other US states. In one study, data was collected from 3,000 mesothelioma patients in California and 890 men with prostate cancer, a malignancy not known to be related to asbestos. The study found a correlation between the incidence of mesotheliomas and the distance a patient lived from known deposits of rock likely to include asbestos; the correlation was not present when the incidence of prostate cancer was compared with the same distances. The risk of mesothelioma declined by 6% for every 10 km (6.2 mi) that an individual had lived away from a likely asbestos source.

Portions of El Dorado County, California are known to contain natural amphibole asbestos formations at the surface. The USGS studied amphiboles in rock and soil in the area in response to an EPA sampling study and subsequent criticism of the EPA study. The EPA study was refuted by its own peer reviewers and never completed or published. The study found that many amphibole particles in the area meet the counting rule criteria used by the EPA for chemical and morphological limits, but do not meet morphological requirements for commercial-grade-asbestos. The executive summary pointed out that even particles that do not meet requirements for commercial-grade-asbestos may be a health threat and suggested a collaborative research effort to assess health risks associated with "Naturally Occurring Asbestos."

However, the main criticism pointed at EPA was that their testing was conducted in small isolated areas of El Dorado where there were no amphibole asbestos deposits, thus the language regarding amphibole, nonfibrous "particles". Actual surface amphibole deposits in residential areas were ignored for testing purposes. Because of this, no final findings were published by ATSDR.

A great deal of Fairfax County, Virginia was also found to be underlaid with tremolite. The county monitored air quality at construction sites, controlled soil taken from affected areas, and required freshly developed sites to lay 6 inches (150 mm) of clean, stable material over the ground.

Globally, samples collected from Antarctic ice indicate chrysotile asbestos has been a ubiquitous contaminant of the environment for at least 10,000 years. Snow samples in Japan have shown ambient background levels are one to two orders of magnitude higher in urban than in rural areas. Higher concentrations of airborne asbestos fibers are reported in urban areas where there is more ACM (asbestos containing materials) and mechanisms of release (vehicles braking and weathering of asbestos cement materials); concentrations in the range of 1–20 ng/m^{3} have been reported. Fibers longer than 5μm are rarely found in rural areas. Ambient concentrations using TEM analysis have been based on mass measurements.

== Biological interactions ==
=== Mechanisms of carcinogenicity ===
Stanton and Layard hypothesized in 1977–78 that toxicity of fibrous materials is not initiated by chemical effects; that is, any trigger-effects of asbestos must presumably be physical, such as mechanical damage which might disrupt normal cell activity—especially mitosis.

There is experimental evidence that very slim fibers (<60 nm, <0.06 μm in breadth) tangle destructively with chromosomes (being of comparable size). This is likely to cause the sort of mitosis disruption expected in cancer.

=== Chemistry ===
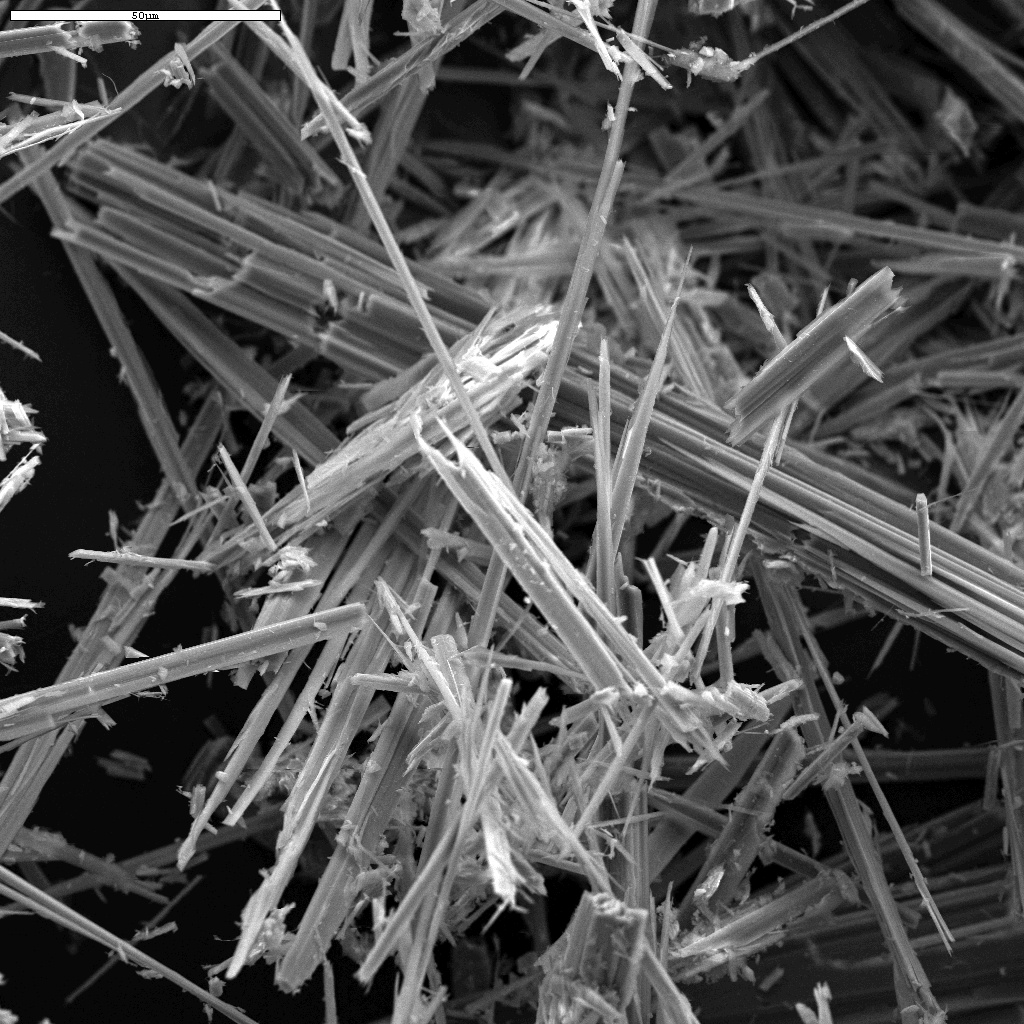
Asbestos fibers (SEM micrograph)

Individual asbestos fibers are invisible to the unaided human eye because their size is about 3–20 μm wide and can be as slim as 0.01 μm. Fibers ultimately form because when these minerals originally cooled and crystallized, they formed by the polymeric molecules lining up parallel with each other and forming oriented crystal lattices. These crystals thus have three cleavage planes, and in this case, there are two cleavage planes which are much weaker than the third. When sufficient force is applied, they tend to break along their weakest directions, resulting in a linear fragmentation pattern and hence a fibrous form. This fracture process can keep occurring and one larger asbestos fiber can ultimately become the source of hundreds of much thinner and smaller fibers.

When fibers or asbestos structures from asbestos containing materials (ACM) become airborne, the process is called primary release. Primary release mechanisms include abrasion, impaction, fallout, air erosion, vibration, and fire damage. Secondary release occurs when settled asbestos fibers and structures are resuspended as a result of human activities. In unoccupied buildings or during unoccupied periods, fiber release typically occurs by fallout or is induced by vibration or air erosion.

Friability of a product containing asbestos means that it is so soft and weak in structure that it can be broken with simple finger crushing pressure. Friable materials are of the most initial concern because of their ease of damage. The forces or conditions of usage that come into intimate contact with most non-friable materials containing asbestos are substantially higher than finger pressure.

=== Smoking and asbestos ===
Smoking has a supra-additive effect in increasing the risk of lung cancer in those exposed to asbestos. Studies have shown an increased risk of lung cancer among smokers who are exposed to asbestos compared to nonsmokers.

== History of health concerns and regulation ==
For additional chronological citations, see also, List of asbestos disease medical articles

=== Until 1900 ===
Early concern in the modern era on the health effects of asbestos exposure can be found in several sources. Among the earliest were reports in Britain. The annual reports of the Chief Inspector of Factories in 1898 included a report from Lucy Deane which stated that asbestos had "easily demonstrated" health risks.

At about the same time, what was probably the first study of mortality among asbestos workers was reported in France. While the study describes the cause of death as chalicosis, a generalized pneumoconiosis, the circumstances of the employment of the fifty workers whose death prompted the study suggest that the root cause was asbestos or mixed asbestos-cotton dust exposure.

=== 1900s–1910s ===
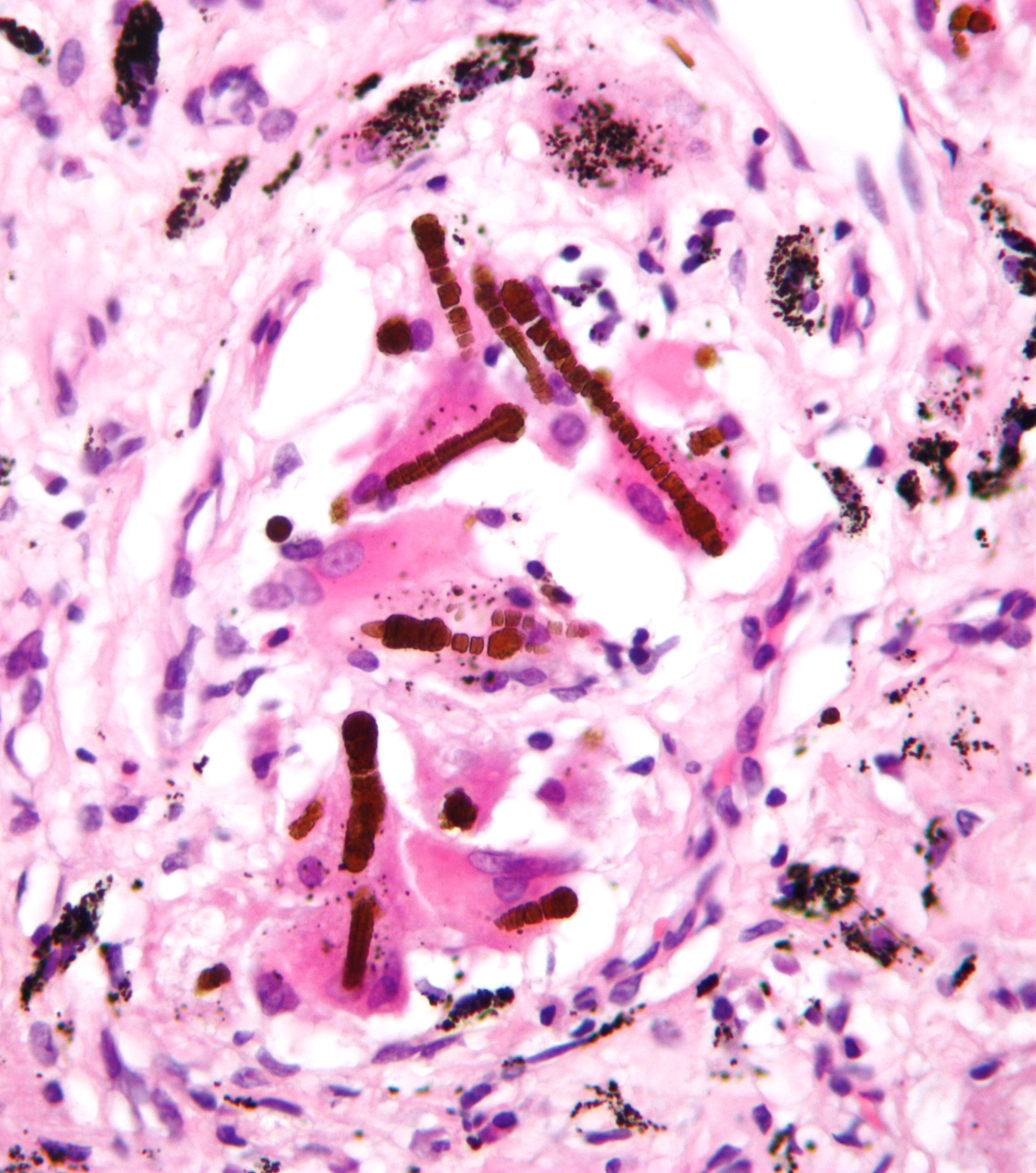
Micrograph demonstrating asbestosis of the lung (ferruginous bodies). H&E stain.

Awareness of asbestos-related diseases can be found in the early 1900s, when London doctor H. Montague Murray conducted a post mortem exam on a young asbestos factory worker who died in 1899. Dr. Murray gave testimony on this death in connection with an industrial disease compensation hearing. The post-mortem confirmed the presence of asbestos in the lung tissue, prompting Dr. Murray to express as an expert opinion his belief that the inhalation of asbestos dust had at least contributed to, if not actually caused, the death of the worker.

The record in the United States was similar. Early observations were largely anecdotal in nature and did not definitively link the occupation with the disease, followed by more compelling and larger studies that strengthened the association. One such study, published in 1918, noted:

All of these processes unquestionably involve a considerable dust hazard, but the hygienic aspects of the industry have not been reported upon. It may be said, in conclusion, that in the practice of American and Canadian life insurance companies, asbestos workers are generally declined on account of the assumed health-injurious conditions of the industry.

=== 1920s–1930s ===
Widespread recognition of the occupational risks of asbestos in Britain was reported in 1924 by a Dr. Cooke, a pathologist, who introduced a case description of a 33-year-old female asbestos worker, Nellie Kershaw, with the following: "Medical men in areas where asbestos is manufactured have long suspected the dust to be the cause of chronic bronchitis and fibrosis ..." Dr. Cooke then went on to report on a case in 1927 involving a 33-year-old male worker who was the only survivor out of ten workers in an asbestos carding room. In the report he named the disease "asbestosis".

Dr. Cooke's second case report was followed, in the late 1920s, by a large public health investigation (now known as the Merewether report after one of its two authors) that examined some 360 asbestos-textile workers (reported to be about 15% of the total comparable employment in Britain at the time) and found that about a quarter of them had pulmonary fibrosis. This investigation resulted in improved regulation of the manufacturing of asbestos-containing products in the early 1930s. Regulations included industrial hygiene standards, medical examinations, and inclusion of the asbestos industry into the British Workers' Compensation Act.

The first known U.S. workers' compensation claim for asbestos disease was in 1927. In 1930, the first reported autopsy of a person with asbestosis was conducted in the United States and later presented by a doctor at the Mayo Clinic, although in this case the exposure involved mining activities somewhere in South America.

In 1930, the major asbestos company Johns-Manville produced a report, for internal company use only, about medical reports of asbestos worker fatalities. In 1932, a letter from U.S. Bureau of Mines to asbestos manufacturer Eagle-Picher stated, in relevant part, "It is now known that asbestos dust is one of the most dangerous dusts to which man is exposed."

In 1933, Metropolitan Life Insurance Co. doctors found that 29% of workers in a Johns-Manville plant had asbestosis. Likewise, in 1933, Johns-Manville officials settled lawsuits by 11 employees with asbestosis on the condition that the employees' lawyer agree to never again "directly or indirectly participate in the bringing of new actions against the Corporation." In 1934, officials of two large asbestos companies, Johns-Manville and Raybestos-Manhattan, edited an article about the diseases of asbestos workers written by a Metropolitan Life Insurance Company doctor. The changes downplayed the danger of asbestos dust. In 1935, officials of Johns-Manville and Raybestos-Manhattan instructed the editor of Asbestos magazine to publish nothing about asbestosis. In 1936, a group of asbestos companies agreed to sponsor research on the health effects of asbestos dust, but required that the companies maintain complete control over the disclosure of the results.

=== 1940s ===
In 1942, an internal Owens-Corning corporate memo referred to "medical literature on asbestosis ... scores of publications in which the lung and skin hazards of asbestos are discussed." Testimony given in a federal court in 1984 by Charles H. Roemer, formerly an employee of Unarco, described a meeting in the early 1940s between Unarco officials, J-M President Lewis H. Brown and J-M attorney Vandiver Brown. Roemer stated, "I'll never forget, I turned to Mr. Brown, one of the Browns made this crack (that Unarco managers were a bunch of fools for notifying employees who had asbestosis), and I said, 'Mr. Brown, do you mean to tell me you would let them work until they dropped dead?' He said, 'Yes. We save a lot of money that way.'" In 1944, a Metropolitan Life Insurance Company report found 42 cases of asbestosis among 195 asbestos miners.

=== 1950s ===
In 1951, asbestos companies removed all references to cancer before allowing publication of research they sponsored. In 1952, Dr. Kenneth Smith, Johns-Manville medical director, recommended (unsuccessfully) that warning labels be attached to products containing asbestos. Later, Smith testified: "It was a business decision as far as I could understand ... the corporation is in business to provide jobs for people and make money for stockholders and they had to take into consideration the effects of everything they did and if the application of a caution label identifying a product as hazardous would cut into sales, there would be serious financial implications."

In 1953, National Gypsum's safety director wrote to the Indiana Division of Industrial Hygiene, recommending that acoustic plaster mixers wear respirators "because of the asbestos used in the product." Another company official noted that the letter was "full of dynamite" and urged that it be retrieved before reaching its destination. A memo in the files noted that the company "succeeded in stopping" the letter, which "will be modified."

=== 1960s–1980s ===
Through the 1970s, asbestos was used to fireproof roofing and flooring, for heat insulation, and for a variety of other purposes. The material was used in fire-check partitioning and doors on North Sea Oil Production Platforms and Rigs.

During the mid-to late 1980s, public health concern focused on potential asbestos fiber exposures of building occupants and workers in buildings containing asbestos containing building materials (ACBM) and their risks of developing lung cancer or mesothelioma. As a consequence, the Health Effects Institute (Cambridge, MA) convened a panel to evaluate the lifetime cancer risk of general building occupants as well as service workers.

=== Modern regulation ===
==== United States ====
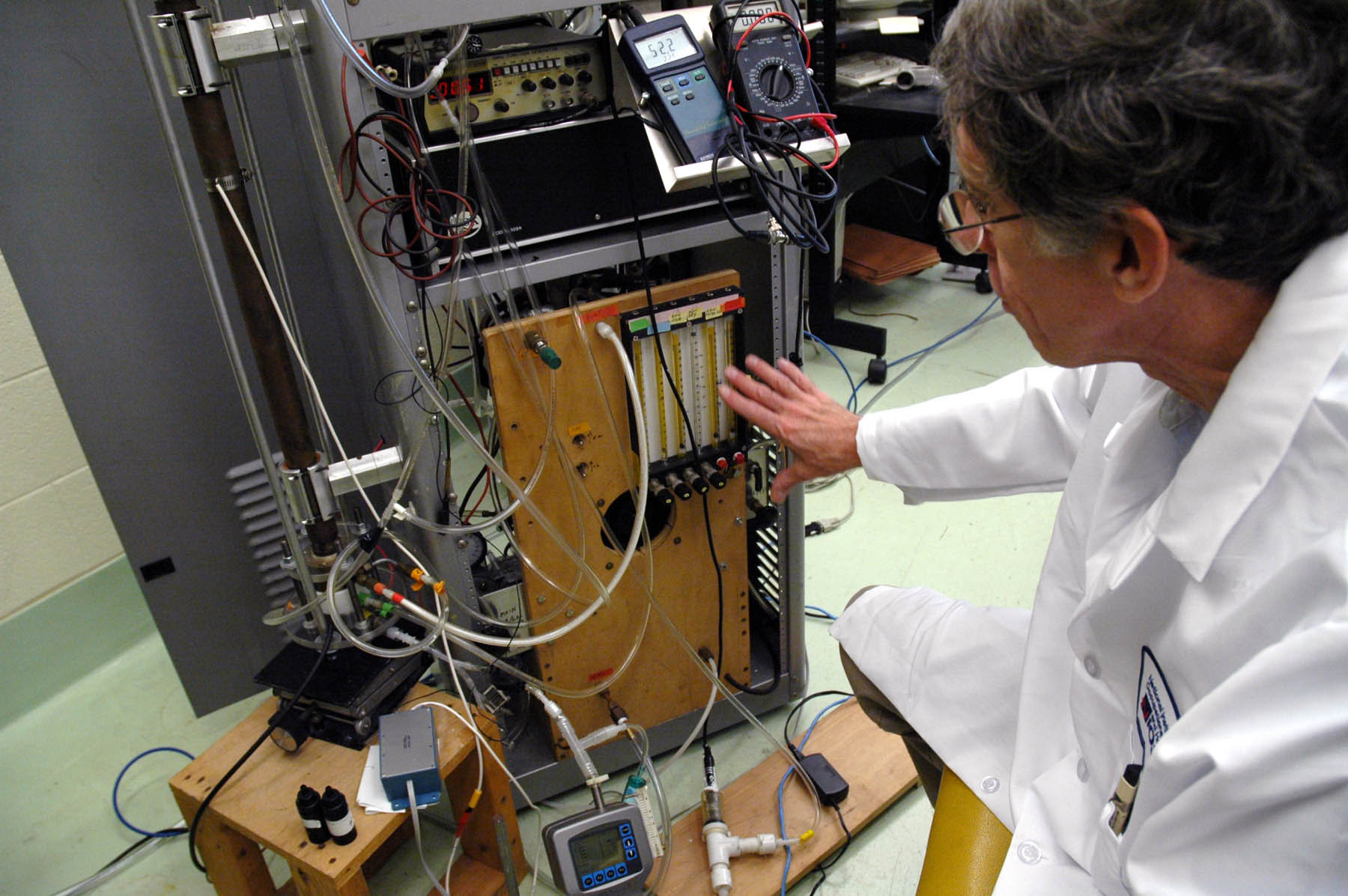
Researcher using a fiber length classifier to produce length-selected fibers of asbestos for toxological studies.

The United States remains one of the few developed countries to not completely ban asbestos. While it has banned its use for certain items, it is legal for use in products such as clothing, pipeline wraps, vinyl floor tiles, millboards, cement pipes, disk brake pads, gaskets and roof coatings.

In 1989 the EPA issued the Asbestos Ban and Phase Out Rule but in 1991, asbestos industry supporters challenged and overturned the ban in a landmark lawsuit: Corrosion Proof Fittings v. the Environmental Protection Agency. Although the case resulted in several small victories for asbestos regulation, the EPA ultimately did not put an end to asbestos use. This ruling leaves many consumer products that can still legally contain trace amounts of asbestos. For a clarification of products which legally contain asbestos, read the EPA's clarification statement.

In 2010, Washington State banned asbestos in automotive brakes starting in 2014. The Occupational Safety and Health Administration (OSHA), has set limits of 100,000 fibers with lengths greater than or equal to 5 μm per cubic meter of workplace air for eight-hour shifts and 40-hour work weeks.

==== Canada ====
In Canada, asbestos use declined through the mid-1970s and early 1980s before ultimately being banned on December 30th, 2018 when the Prohibition of Asbestos and Products Containing Asbestos Regulations went into effect. Notably, these regulations include provisions to allow the use of asbestos for military and nuclear purposes.

==== United Kingdom ====
In the United Kingdom, blue and brown asbestos materials were banned outright in 1985 while the import, sale and second hand reuse of white asbestos was outlawed in 1999. The 2012 Control of Asbestos Regulations state that owners of non-domestic buildings (e.g., factories and offices) have a "duty to manage" asbestos on the premises by making themselves aware of its presence and ensuring the material does not deteriorate, removing it if necessary. Employers, e.g. construction companies, whose operatives may come into contact with asbestos must also provide annual asbestos training to their workers.

==== New Zealand ====
In 1984, the import of raw amphibole (blue and brown) asbestos into New Zealand was banned. In 2002 the import of chrysotile (white) asbestos was also banned. In 2015 the government announced that the importation of asbestos would be completely banned with very limited exceptions (expected to be applied to replacement parts for older machines) that would be reviewed on a case-by-case basis.

North-west of Nelson, in the Upper Takaka Valley is New Zealand's only commercially harvested asbestos mine. A low-grade Chrysotile was mined here from 1908 to 1917 but only 100 tons was washed and taken out by packhorse. A new power scheme enabled work to renew and between 1940 and 1949, 40 tons a month was mined by the Hume Company. This continued to 1964, when, due to the short length of its fibre, the limited commercial viability forced mining to cease.

==== Australia ====
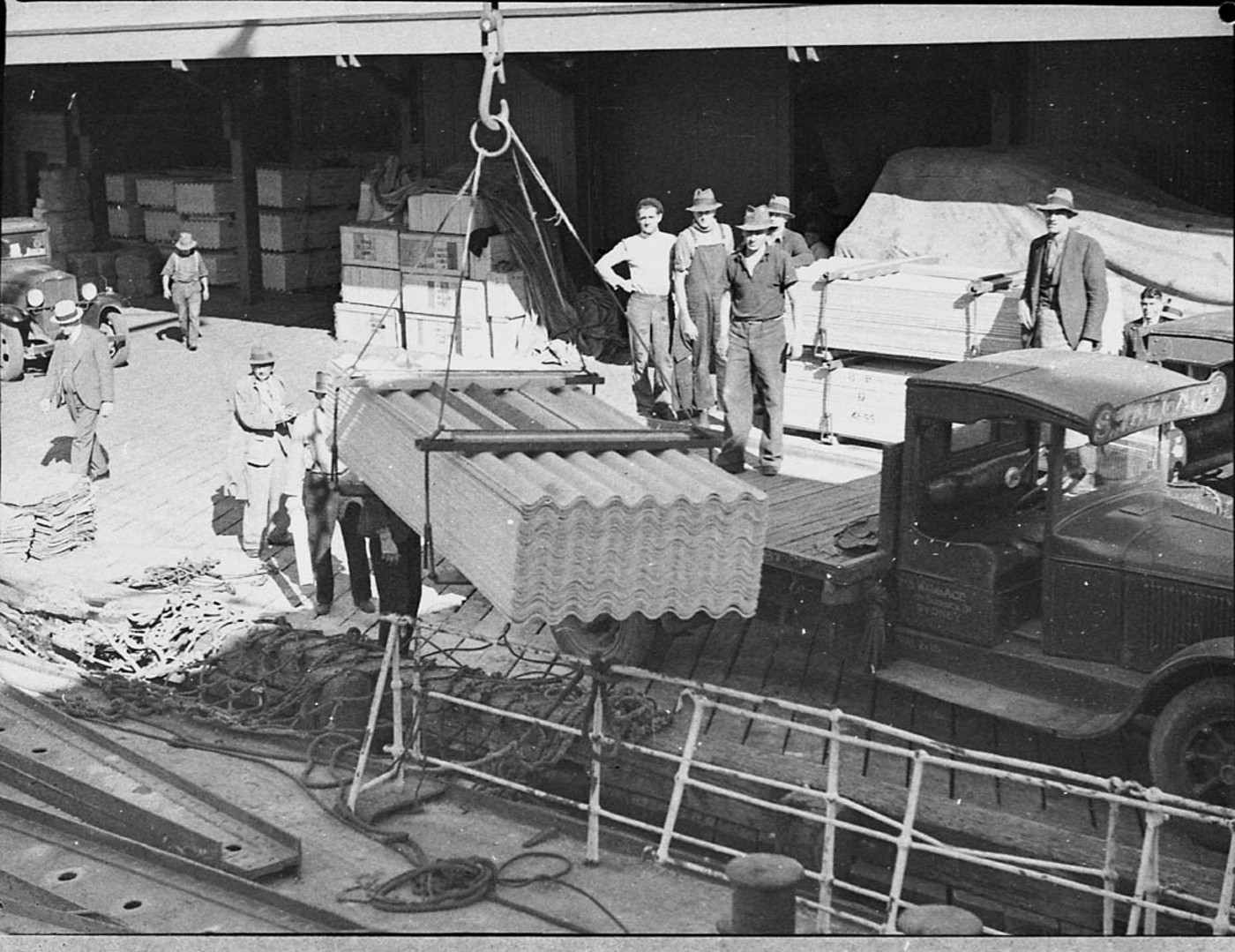
Asbestos Products Ltd exporting asbestos

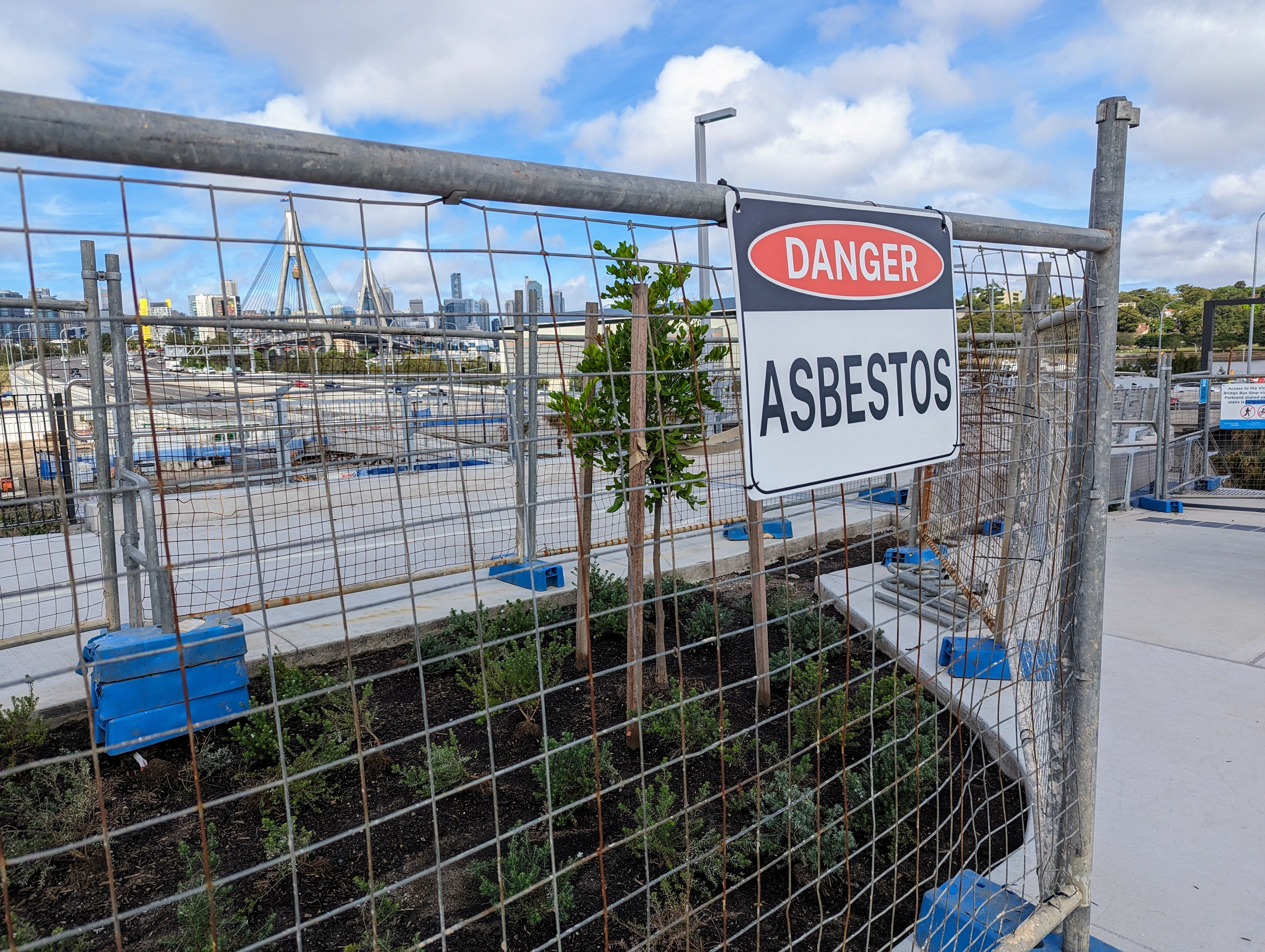
Asbestos-contaminated mulch in Sydney

The use of crocidolite (blue) asbestos was banned in 1967, while the use of amosite (brown) asbestos continued in the construction industry until the mid-1980s. It was finally banned from building products in 1989, though it remained in gaskets and brake linings until 31 December 2003, and cannot be imported, used or recycled.

Asbestos continues to be a problem. Two out of three homes in Australia built between World War II and the early 1980s still contain asbestos.

The union that represents workers tasked with modifying electrical meter boxes at residences stated that workers should refuse to do this work until the boxes have been inspected for asbestos, and the head of the Australian Council of Trade Unions (ACTU) has called on the government to protect its citizens by ridding the country of asbestos by 2030.

Handlers of asbestos materials must have a B-Class license for bonded asbestos and an A-Class license for friable asbestos.

The town of Wittenoom, in Western Australia was built around a blue asbestos mine. The entire town continues to be contaminated, and has been disincorporated, allowing local authorities to remove references to Wittenoom from maps and roadsigns.

In January 2024, asbestos was found in garden mulch supplied to dozens of sites including parks, playgrounds and schools across Sydney, triggering the Sydney asbestos mulch crisis.

==== Brazil ====
Despite the mining and use of asbestos reaching the country's Supreme Court, Brazil is the world's third-largest producer and exporter of chrysotile asbestos. São Paulo State law 12.684/07 prohibits the use of any product which utilizes asbestos but many buildings are still constructed of products containing asbestos. As a result, it is estimated that up to 15,000 Brazilians die each year of exposure to asbestos.

==== Japan ====
Revelations that hundreds of workers had died in Japan over the previous few decades from diseases related to asbestos sparked a scandal in mid-2005. Tokyo had, in 1971, ordered companies handling asbestos to install ventilators and check health on a regular basis; however, the Japanese government did not ban crocidolite and amosite until 1995, and a near complete ban with a few exceptions on asbestos was implemented in 2006, with the remaining exceptions being removed in March 2012 for a full-fledged ban.

==== South Korea ====
In May 1997, the manufacture and use of crocidolite and amosite, commonly known as blue and brown asbestos, were fully banned in South Korea. In January 2009, a full-fledged ban on all types of asbestos occurred when the government banned the manufacture, import, sale, storage, transport or use of asbestos or any substance containing more than 0.1% of asbestos. In 2011, South Korea became the world's sixth country to enact an asbestos harm aid act, which entitles any Korean citizen to free lifetime medical care as well as monthly income from the government if they are diagnosed with an asbestos-related disease.

==== Singapore ====
Use of all types of asbestos has been banned in Singapore since 1989. Currently, only removal of asbestos-containing materials is allowed in Singapore and the Ministry of Manpower must be notified before work commences.

==== Turkey ====
A complete ban on asbestos in Turkey went into effect in 2011.

Finland

The manufacture and import of asbestos containing building materials was banned from 1993 onwards, while the selling and use of such materials was banned from 1994.

=== Delayed recognition ===
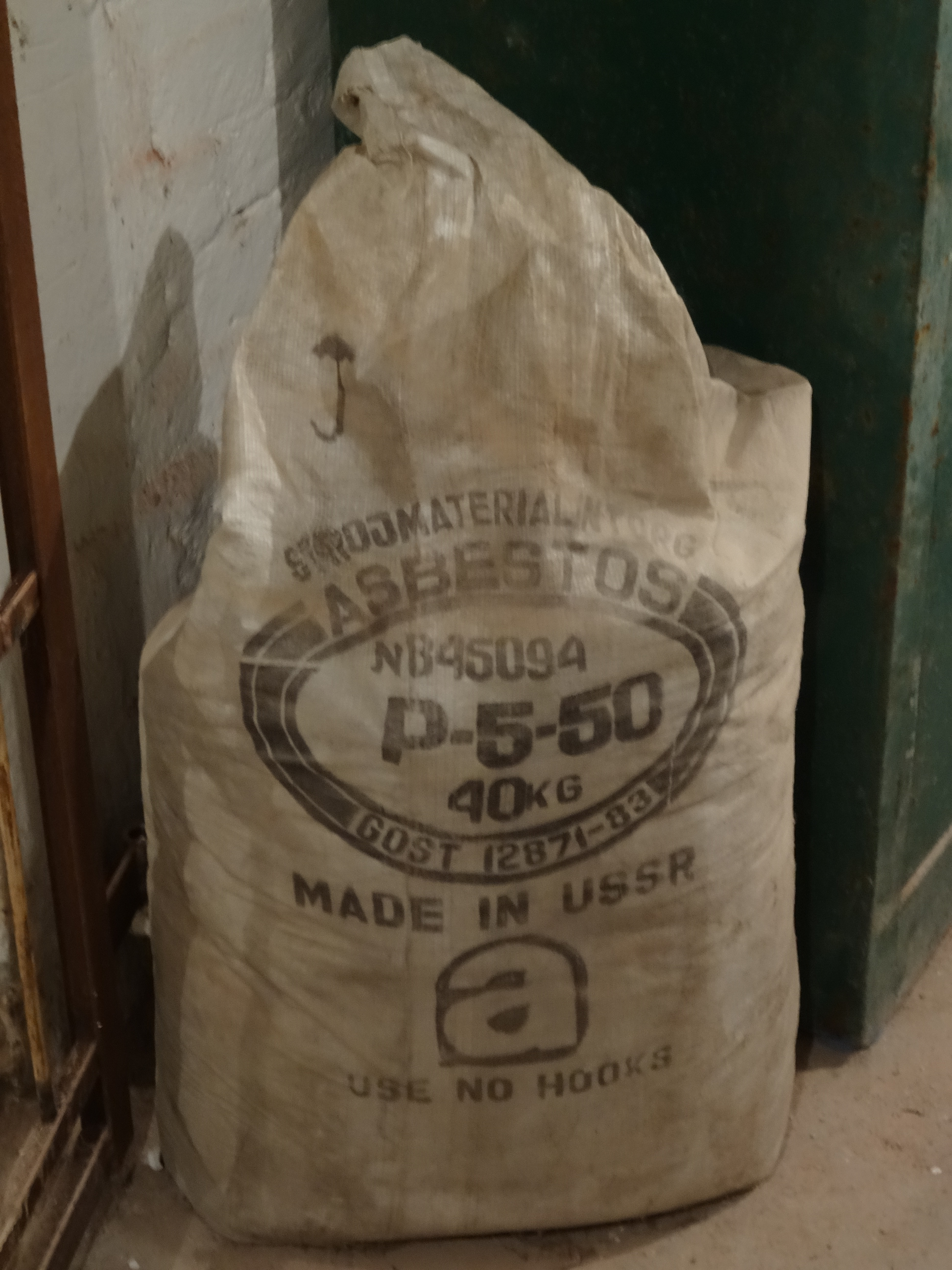
Soviet made asbestos, after 1983. No EHS information.

In a 1998 paper, medical historian Peter Bartrip examines why awareness and legislation appear to have lagged unduly, compared to evidence of the risks of asbestos. The paper concludes by agreeing with a previous paper ('Asbestos: a chronology of its origins and health effects', British Journal of Independent Medicine, 1990) and the 1930 report of Edward Mereweather (a factory medical inspector involved in the legislative investigations of the time), that despite theories suggesting a coverup and historical evidence that could be cobbled together after the fact, it is more likely that the issue was one of hindsight.

According to Bartrip, Mereweather's 1930 report identified six relevant issues:

1. Significant commercial exploitation of asbestos was still relatively new.
2. The industry was small and employed comparatively few workers, particularly in dusty processes.
3. The disease developed slowly and unobtrusively.
4. The disease was easily confused with tuberculosis.
5. Affected workers left the industry and therefore fell out of sight of Factory Inspectors. (Gee, below, states that studies "focused on factories, rather than users")
6. Medical research had concentrated on dusts containing free silica.

There had been earlier discussion, notably a few brief comments by Factory Inspectors Adelaide Anderson and Edgar Collis during 1898–1911, described by Bartrip as minor reports of no great substance in otherwise very large reports about factory workers. As a result, he concludes that between 1898 and the late 1920s, all that can be said is that, "the dangers of the material were slowly beginning to be appreciated". As of 1927, the Senior Medical Inspector had reported that the effect of asbestos dust inhalation "was as yet imperfectly understood".

A second paper, by Gee & Greenberg, noted additional factors:

1. The discovery of carcinogenicity of smoking at approximately the same time as the 1950s asbestos studies, had made it far harder to prove a proposed causative link for asbestos.
2. Anecdotal evidence and hearsay noted by local doctors and inspectors, was not pursued or taken seriously.
3. "Negative" cancer studies were used, which are poor at detecting statistically significant pathology rates unless they include follow-up for around 30 years.
4. A "latency lacuna" exists and contributes to complacency (also reported by Knox 1965) – as the consequences of exposure take decades to arise, by the time they occur it is possible to argue convincingly that "standards have improved" and that therefore the risk is eliminated; however this in turn is not confirmed for another 30 years by which time the same argument can be raised again. Compared to short-term needs, a "speculative" risk not yet confirmed may carry less weight, until long after the time when action could be taken.
5. Long term surveys and sanction regimes failed to match short term pressures within politics, nor those within industry; in the case of asbestos they were inadequate.
6. Fallacious arguments were used, such as the observation that many asbestos workers remained healthy into old age as evidence of lack of risk or lack of harm. As even the most harmful occupation can have numerous apparent healthy survivors this is an example of "absence of evidence" being interpreted as "evidence of absence".
7. As late as 1967, even The Lancet was capable of writing that "it would be ludicrous to outlaw this valuable and often irreplaceable material in all circumstances (as) asbestos can save more lives than it can possibly endanger".

== Litigation ==
Litigation related to asbestos is regarded as one of the largest litigation cases in legal history in terms of duration, claim size, and scope. Factors responsible for this include:

1. Asbestos use was extremely widespread: It was used across many sectors, countries, industries and uses. It was also widespread in society itself, being used not in limited "niche" areas but within many everyday products, in housing, fire protection, and even decorative material such as Artex, as well as numerous other ways. Over 50% of homes in some countries contained asbestos even after its ban there. So it was somewhat ubiquitous;
2. Knowledge or suspicion of health issues existed for a long time: The health issues related to asbestos were known, suspected, or reported, for decades, with modern medical coverage dating back to the 19th century.
3. Impact was severe, and included factors that tend to lead to high claims: serious and fatal disease; also apart from death the costs include long-term care and disability, care costs, lifetime loss of income, and other high value compensations.
4. Relatively easy to be at risk: asbestos-related diseases are caused by inhaling tiny airborne fibers, therefore any activity related to asbestos that led to loose dust or fibers could potentially cause disease (Secondary asbestosis). As a result, illness occurred not only in the widespread primary industries using asbestos, such as the asbestos mining and processing businesses, but also across industries that might handle their products (construction and demolition, repairs, fire safety), persons who disturbed asbestos products in their homes or workplaces, and even those who laundered clothing used by asbestos workers.
5. Illnesses arise long after exposure: asbestos related diseases can arise decades after actual exposure.
6. Asbestos industry alleged misconduct: alleged concealing, distorting, and suppressing of risk related information, by asbestos related businesses.

As of 1999, trends indicate that the worldwide rate at which people are diagnosed with asbestos-related diseases will likely increase through the next decade. Analysts have estimated that the total cost of asbestos litigation in the USA alone is over $250 billion.

In the United Kingdom, more people died in 2011 from asbestos-related causes (4721) than in all types of traffic and transport accidents combined, and new reported cases were estimated at 2126.

In the United States, asbestos litigation is the longest, most expensive mass tort in U.S. history, involving more than 8,400 defendants and 730,000 claimants as of 2002 according to the RAND Corporation, and at least one defendant reported claim counts in excess of $800,000 in 2006.

The federal legal system in the United States has dealt with numerous counts of asbestos-related suits, which often included multiple plaintiffs with similar symptoms. In 1999 there were 200,000 related cases pending in the federal court system of the United States. Further, it is estimated that within the next 40 years, the number of cases may increase to 700,000. These numbers help explain how there are thousands of current pending cases. Litigation of asbestos materials has been slow. Companies sometimes counter saying that health issues do not currently appear in their worker or workers, or sometimes are settled out of court.

The volume of the asbestos liability has concerned manufacturers and insurers and reinsurers. The amounts and method of allocating compensation have been the source of many court cases, and government attempts at resolution of existing and future cases.

In 1999 the United States considered but did not enact the Fairness in Asbestos Compensation Act. Between 1981 and the present, many asbestos companies have filed for bankruptcy. While companies filed for bankruptcy, this limited payouts to those who were actually affected by the material. Christopher Edley, Jr. commented what the 1999 act ultimately would have done if passed would be to "limit punitive damages that seek retribution for the decisions of long-dead executives for conduct that took place decades ago."

Litigation exists outside the United States in England, Scotland, Ireland, the Netherlands, France, Italy, and Japan among other nations (though the amounts awarded in these countries are not as large as in the US). See the companion article for further information.

In Australia a significant and controversial case was brought against the industrial building materials company James Hardie, which had mined and sold asbestos related products for many years.

== Criticisms of asbestos regulation ==
Criticisms of regulation include the discredited suggestion by Dixy Lee Ray that the Space Shuttle Challenger disintegrated because the maker of O-ring putty was pressured by the EPA into ceasing production of asbestos-laden putty. However, the putty used in Challenger's final flight contained asbestos, and failures in the putty were not responsible for the failure of the O-ring that led to loss of the shuttle.

Asbestos was also used in the first forty floors of the World Trade Center north tower causing an airborne contamination among lower Manhattan after the towers collapsed in the September 11 attacks. After the attack, another discredited suggestion came from Steven Milloy of the libertarian Cato Institute that the World Trade Center towers could still be standing or at least would have stood longer had a 1971 ban not stopped the completion of the asbestos coating above the 64th floor. This was not considered in the National Institute of Standards and Technology's report on the towers' collapse, on the basis that all fireproofing materials, regardless of their construction, are required to obtain a fire-resistance rating prior to installation, and all fiber-based lightweight commercial spray fireproofing materials are vulnerable to the dispersive effects of high speed/high energy impacts, as these are outside the fire testing upon which all ratings are based. Therefore, asbestos would have made little or no difference in preventing the towers' collapse, if used as fireproofing, and upon collapse any asbestos, however used, would still have been largely dispersed into the air within the massive dust cloud.

== See also ==
- Construction dust
- Construction waste
- Health impacts of sawdust
- Metal dust
- On-tool extraction
- Particulates
- Power tool
- Renovation
- Ultrafine particles
