= Asbestos abatement =

Removal of asbestos from structures

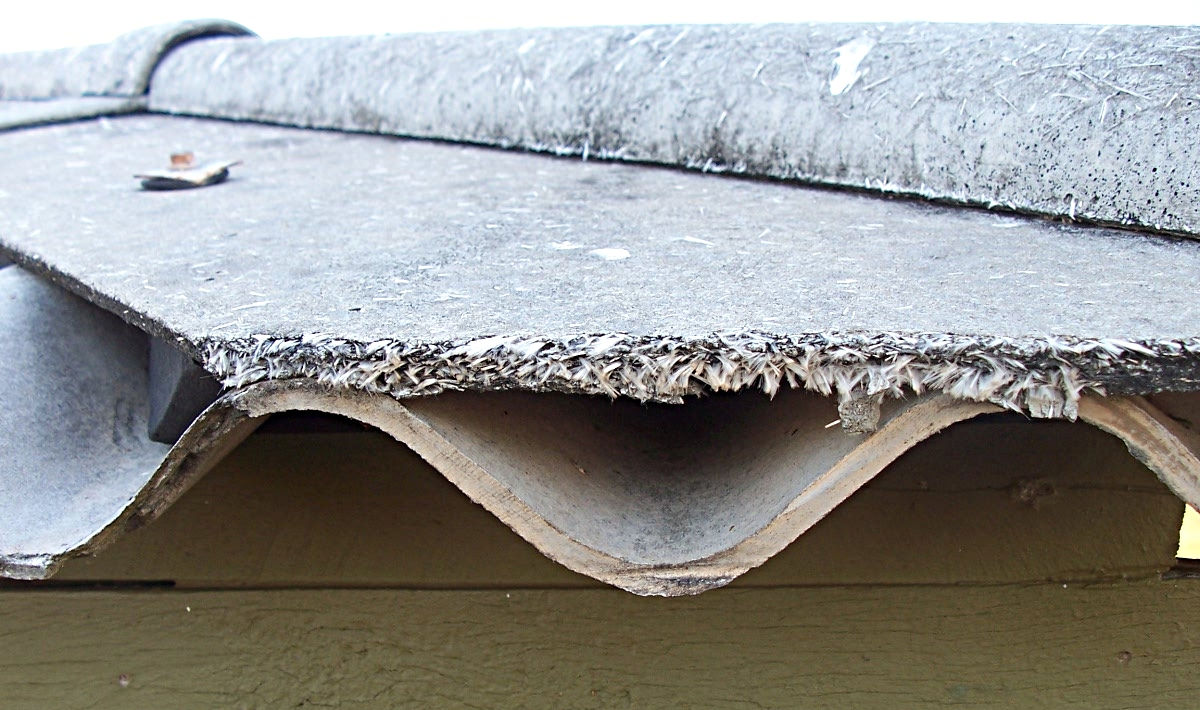
Weathered fibrous asbestos sheeting showing loose fibres

Asbestos abatement in construction is a set of procedures designed to control the release of asbestos fibers from asbestos-containing materials. Asbestos abatement is utilized during general construction in areas containing asbestos materials, particularly when those materials are being removed, encapsulated, or repaired. Abatement is needed in order to protect construction workers and members of the general public from the many negative health impacts of asbestos.

Many residential and commercial buildings contain asbestos, used in spray-applied flame retardant, thermal system insulation, and in a variety of other materials. Asbestos can be flocked above false ceilings, inside technical ducts, and in many other small spaces where firefighters would have difficulty gaining access. Although asbestos is primarily associated with older buildings in many parts of the world, as asbestos bans have been in place in various countries since 1972, 2 million tons of asbestos were still consumed annually as of 2018.

Most buildings containing asbestos are required by law, in the United States, to be documented as such. Paperwork informing those purchasing or leasing or otherwise using those properties is required to be given to those living or working on properties with asbestos, warning them of the dangers. This paperwork usually informs people which steps towards asbestos abatement have been taken.

== Rationale ==
Depending on how and where asbestos was applied, it might not pose any risk to most users of the building. If the fibers cannot become dislodged, they cannot be inhaled, and thus the asbestos poses no risk. However, some methods of applying asbestos, particularly flocking, allow asbestos fibers to gradually drop off into the air. Asbestos poses hazards to maintenance personnel who have to drill holes in walls for installation of cables or pipes. Even if the workers are protected, such maintenance operation may release fibers into the air, which may be inhaled by others. Interventions in areas where asbestos is present often have to follow stringent procedures. Asbestos is a known carcinogen. It is the primary risk factor for mesothelioma, a cancer of the lining of the lungs. It may cause other lung cancers and respiratory diseases such as asbestosis.

When asbestos fibers can easily be made into airborne dust, the material is known as "friable". For example, a popcorn ceiling is extremely friable, whereas asbestos floor tile is considered non-friable. Friable materials, such as popcorn ceiling tiles, have a lifespan between 20–40 years plus; whereas non-friable materials, such as asbestos roofing tiles, have a lifespan of 50–100 years and beyond.

Different countries have different regulations and methods of enforcement, when it comes to asbestos removal. It is extremely important to remember that prior to any asbestos removal procedures taking place; the client has a duty of care and must verify that the specialist removal contractor can provide proof of the following:

- license if licensing is required within the jurisdiction
- specific asbestos public and employer liability insurance
- worker training to include supervisor and contract manager training within the past 12 months
- worker fit-testing and medical surveillance within 12 months
- specialist equipment testing within 6 months - DOP and PAT within the EU

Optionally, the specialist contractor should be able to provide accreditation from ARCA or other such trade organization.

== Procedures ==
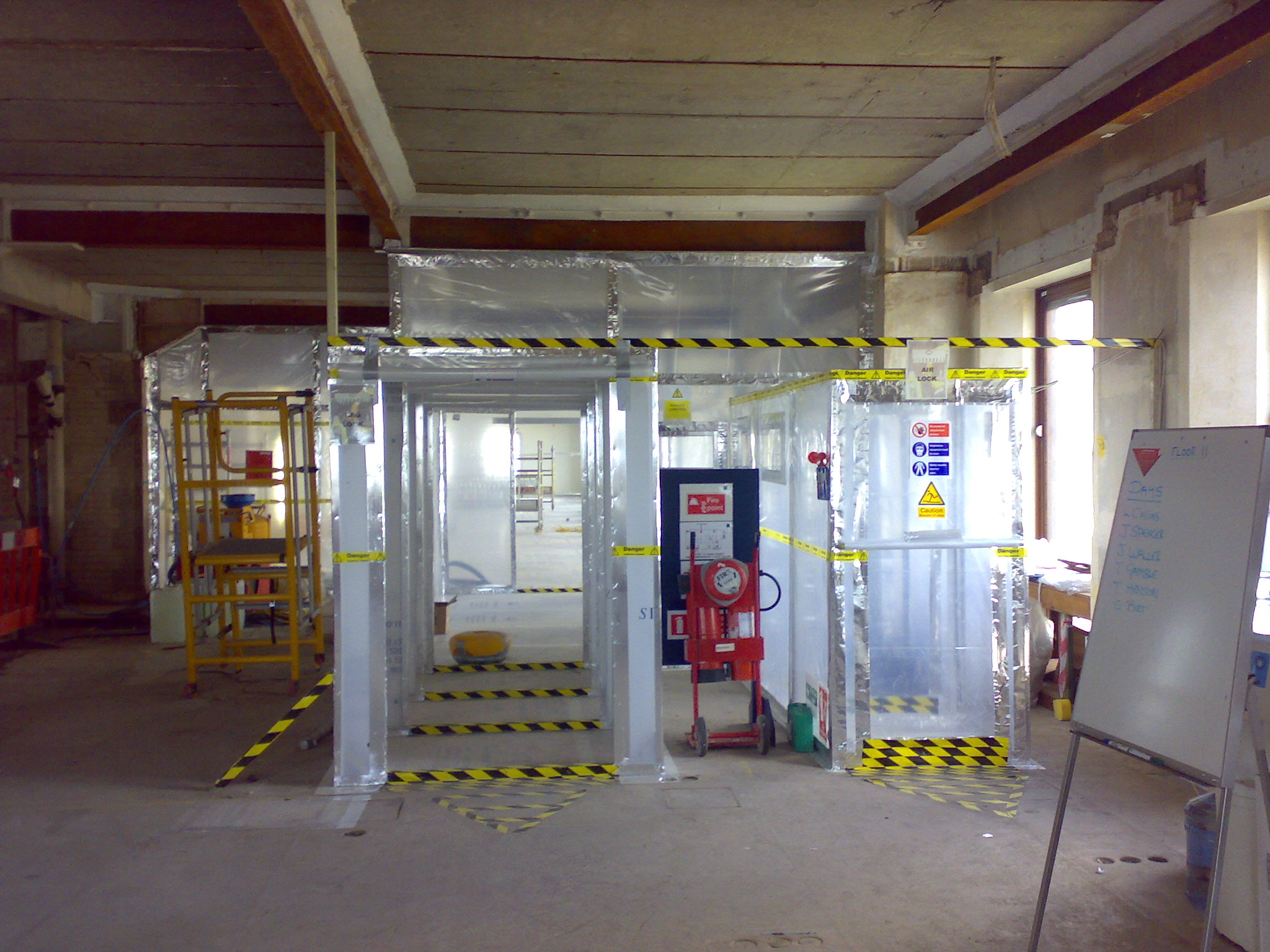
Typical UK temporary enclosure used for asbestos removal

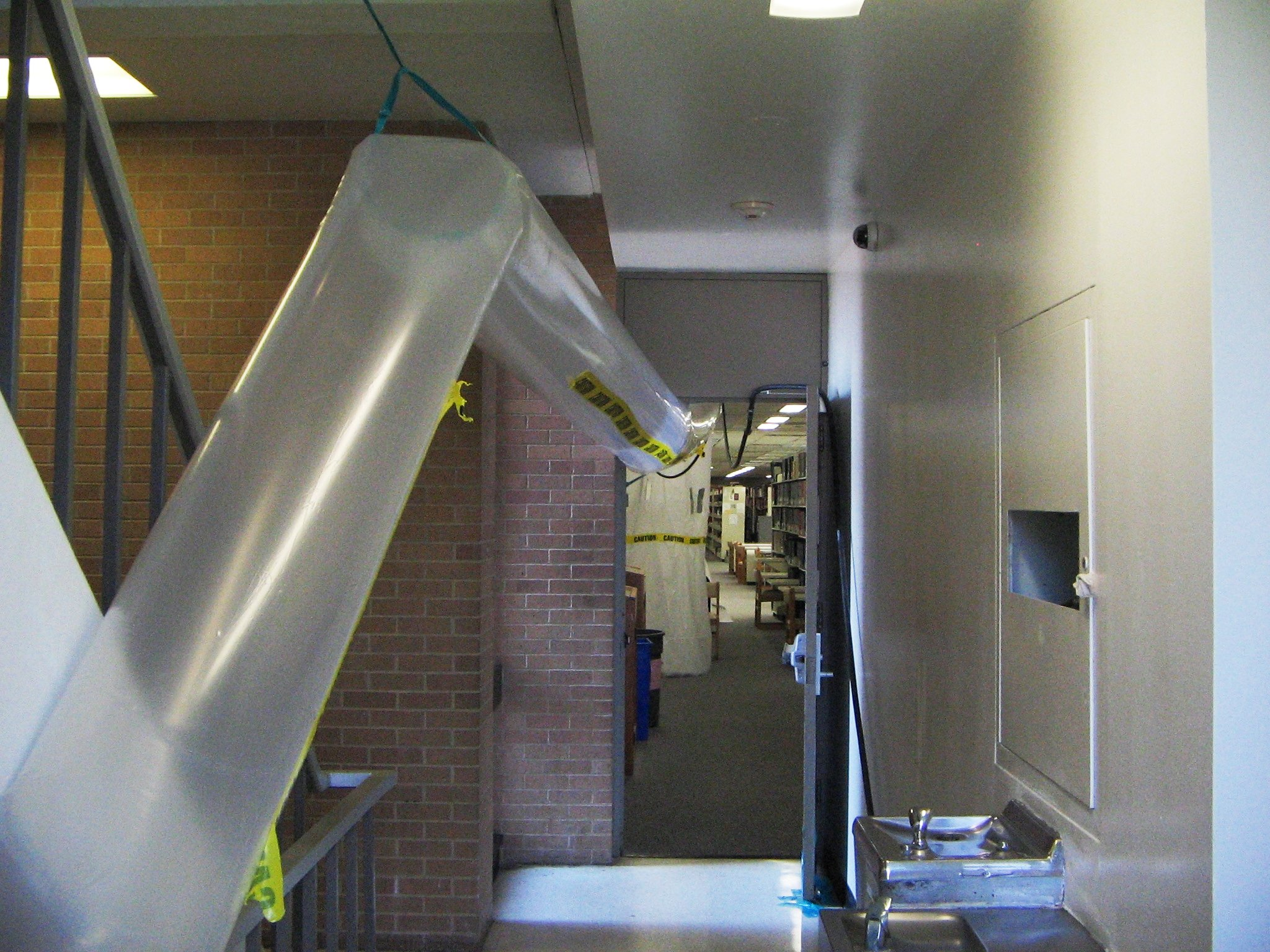
A temporary plastic air duct used to exhaust filtered air from a negative air pressure (suction) machine

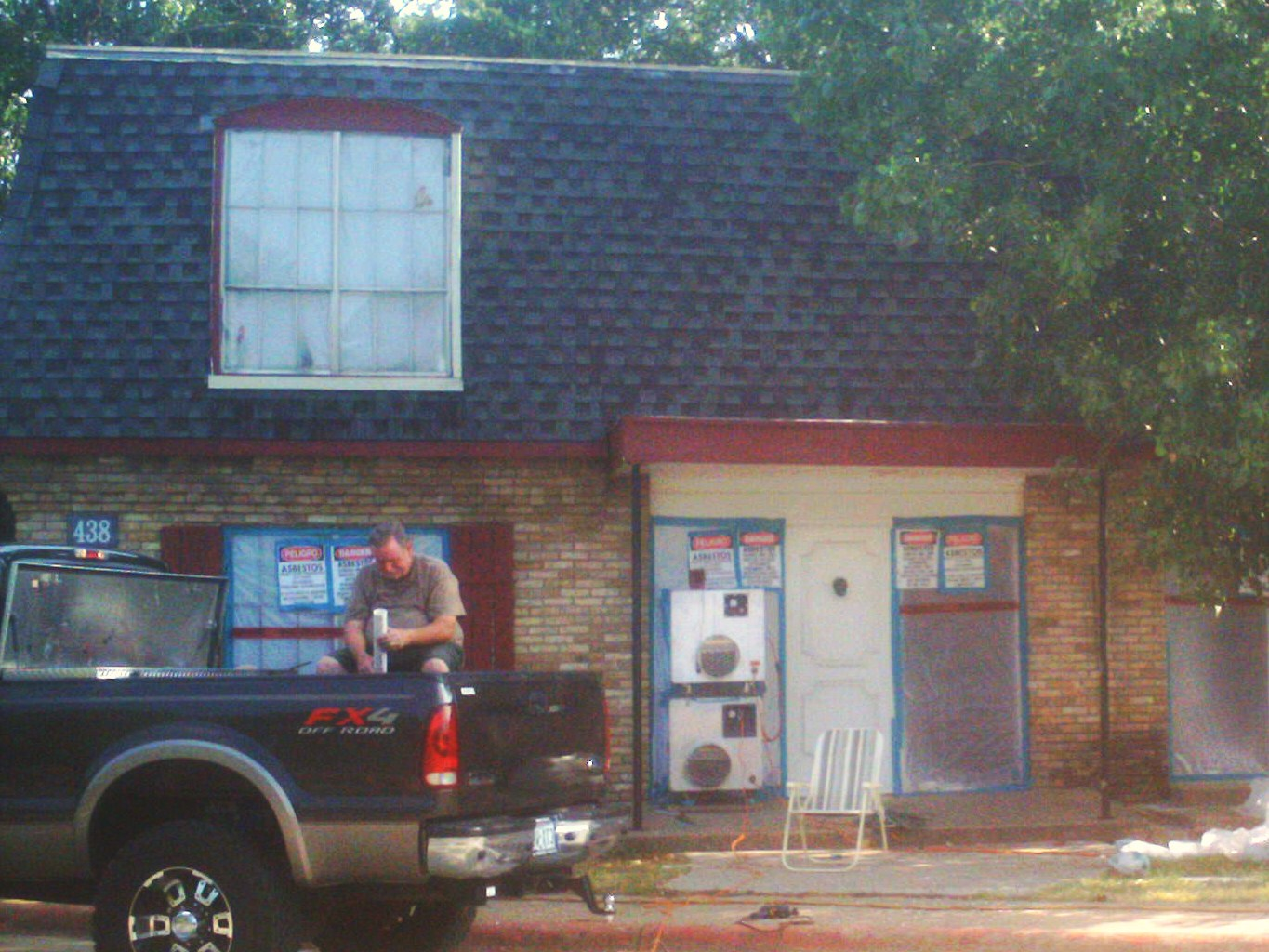
An apartment complex that was subject to asbestos removal before demolition

A licensed inspector will typically conduct a survey of the building to identify all asbestos-containing materials before any removal begins. Suspicious materials are typically sent to a laboratory to confirm presence of asbestos fibers. Contractors who are licensed to remove asbestos will be in charge of abatement and disposal of the material.

Personal protective equipment (PPE) must be worn at all times during removal of asbestos. This includes respirators, coveralls, gloves, eye protection, foot covers, and head covers (hard hats).

When asbestos abatement is taking place, occupants are not allowed to enter the area. Typically, the part of the building from which asbestos is being removed has to be sealed off in order to prevent contamination of the other areas. Methods of sealing off an area often include the use of polyethylene film, duct tape and negative air pressure machines which are fitted with HEPA filters. The idea is that the contained area is pulling fresh air in as to not let asbestos fibers out into the surrounding environment.

Only a special vacuum cleaner that is designed for asbestos containment (class H) can be safely used when cleaning up during and after asbestos removal. Ordinary vacuum cleaners cannot be used, even those fitted with a HEPA filter. An ordinary vacuum cleaner will expel the asbestos fibres into the room air.

If the building is closed to normal users, it may be necessary to seal it off from outside atmosphere so that no accessible air is contaminated. Examples of buildings that required asbestos removal include the Jussieu Campus and the Tour Montparnasse.

An asbestos-containing building that is to be torn down may have to be sealed, and to have its asbestos safely removed before ordinary demolition can be performed. The asbestos removal may take longer and cost more than the actual demolition. For example, the former seat of parliament of East Germany, the Palast der Republik, was stripped of most of its asbestos between 1998 and 2001, before it was finally demolished starting in 2006. The Utah State Prison underwent a full asbestos removal before its demolition.

New innovative methods for asbestos removal have been used. One example is the Lawrence Livermore National Laboratory’s B238 building, where a track mounted wet cutting saw with a diamond blade was used in order to cut the building into small sections. These small sections were then double wrapped in plastic, the minimum requirement when transporting asbestos material, and driven to a landfill. This method not only contained the asbestos material within the gunite and metal layers of the walls, but also kept workers at a safe distance since the saw was controlled remotely.

In many countries, construction activities involving asbestos-containing materials are regulated by government agencies.

Asbestos scrap and contaminated clothing must be placed in bags with labels that specify they contain asbestos. Asbestos-containing material can only be disposed at licensed asbestos waste disposal sites, as it is classified as hazardous waste.

== Occupational risks ==
In the United States, the Occupational Safety and Health Administration (OSHA) as well as the American Conference of Governmental Industrial Hygienists (ACGIH) have designated a permissible exposure limit and Threshold Limit Value, respectively, of 0.1 fiber per cubic centimeter (f/cc) on the basis of pneumoconiosis, mesothelioma, and lung cancer.

Asbestos removal workers are subject to several occupational risks, most notably, accidental inhalation of airborne asbestos fibers. As the industry has made a general shift from production of asbestos to its removal, workers who remove asbestos are more prone to exposure. Physical hazards such as cuts are also present in the workplace, as heavy machinery is occasionally used for removal, and falls are a risk as workers may remove ceiling tiles that can contain asbestos.

== See also ==
- Asbestine
- Asbestos and the law
- Fibro
- Fireproofing
- List of minerals
- Mesothelioma
- Vermiculite
