= Sydney asbestos crisis =

Environmental hazard controversy in Australia

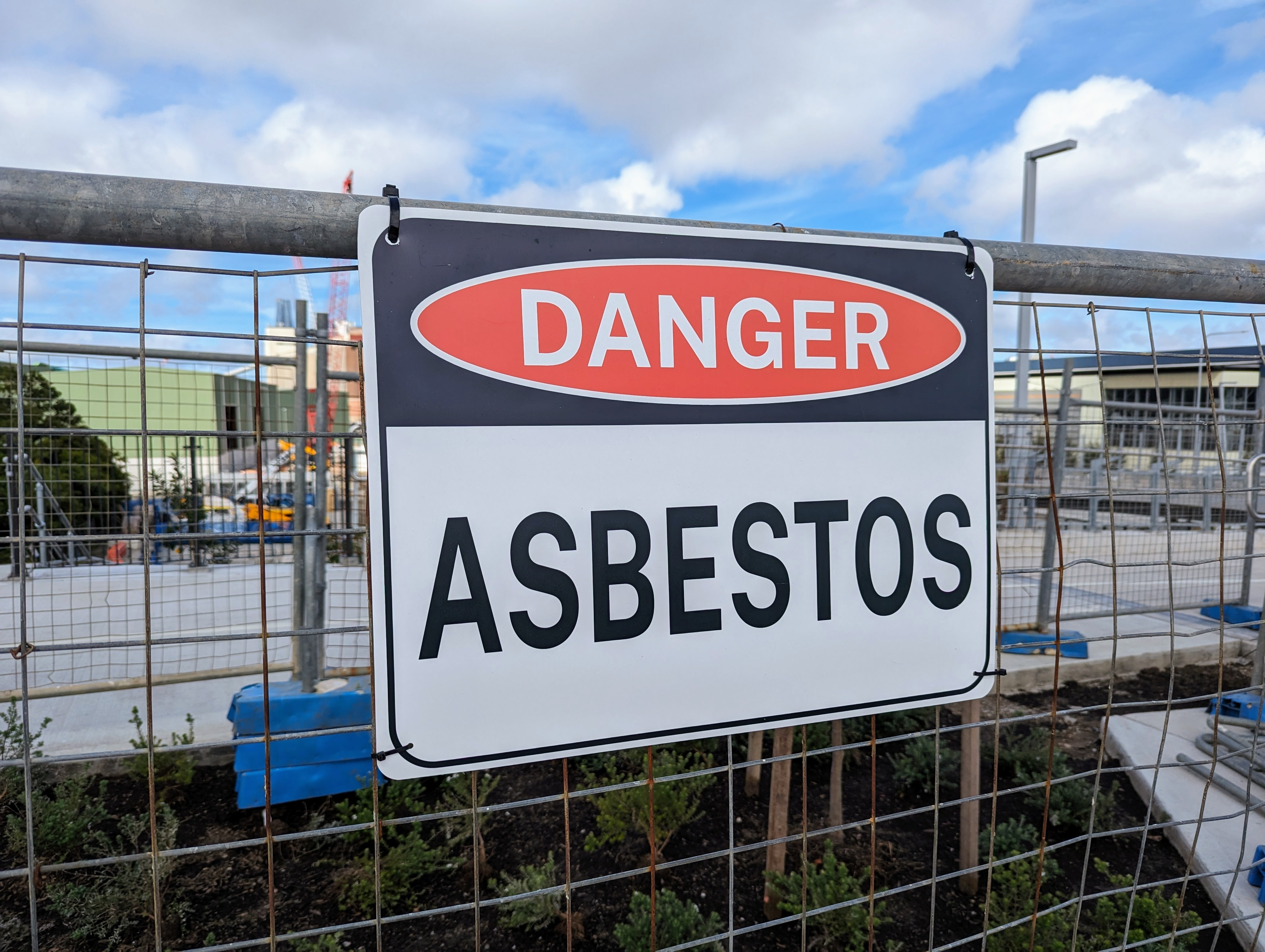
Warning sign for asbestos in Rozelle Parklands

The Sydney asbestos crisis involves the remediation of asbestos-contaminated mulch across dozens of sites including parks, schools, supermarkets, hospitals, housing estates and train stations in Sydney, Australia. Triggered by the January 2024 discovery of asbestos in the Rozelle Parklands, the crisis resulted in the largest criminal investigation undertaken by the New South Wales Environment Protection Authority as of 2024.

== Discovery ==
The crisis was triggered by the January 2024 discovery of asbestos in the Rozelle Parklands, a part of the then-recently opened Rozelle Interchange project in Sydney, Australia.

The asbestos was originally reported by a concerned parent, who spotted a chunk of bonded asbestos in a handful of mulch brought home by their child from a playground. Further testing revealed asbestos contamination in at least 17 different sites across the Parklands, which were closed for remediation.

== Investigation ==
The asbestos-contaminated mulch was traced to the supplier Greenlife Resource Recovery. Testing by the New South Wales Environment Protection Authority (EPA) found asbestos-contaminated mulch at dozens of sites, all supplied by Greenlife. The investigation became the largest ever by the EPA, with hundreds of sites potentially contaminated. Greenlife denied it was the source of the contamination, stating their mulch had been repeatedly tested negative.

In December 2024, the EPA commenced prosecutions against Greenlife and VE Resource Recovery Pty Ltd, alleging a total of 102 offenses involving 79 contaminated sites across New South Wales.

== Impact ==
By February 2024, 33 sites across Sydney had tested positive for asbestos, and one in Nowra. As of 7 March, the number of sites within New South Wales had risen to over 75.

Dr Jeremy McAnulty from NSW Health stated that asbestos needs to be breathed in to be a risk, and merely touching it is typically not a risk for asbestos-related disease. While most findings involved bonded asbestos, which is less likely to become airborne, three sites contained more dangerous friable asbestos.

Samples of mulch containing asbestos were also detected in Canberra, including one site with friable asbestos. Asbestos mulch was also found in Brisbane, leading Workplace Health and Safety Queensland and the Queensland Department of Environment, Science and Innovation to launch their own investigation.

The Rozelle Parklands reopened on 30 April 2024 after a three-month closure and the replacement of all mulch, although some parts remain closed due to an infestation of blue-green algae.
