= List of birds described as ferruginous =

Birds formally described as "ferruginous" include the following:

- Antbirds:
  - Ferruginous antbird
  - Ferruginous-backed antbird
- Ferruginous babbler
- Ferruginous duck
- Ferruginous flycatcher
- Ferruginous hawk
- Ferruginous partridge
- Ferruginous pochard
- Ferruginous pygmy owl
