= Ferruginous body =

Finding in interstitial lung disease suggestive of significant asbestos exposure

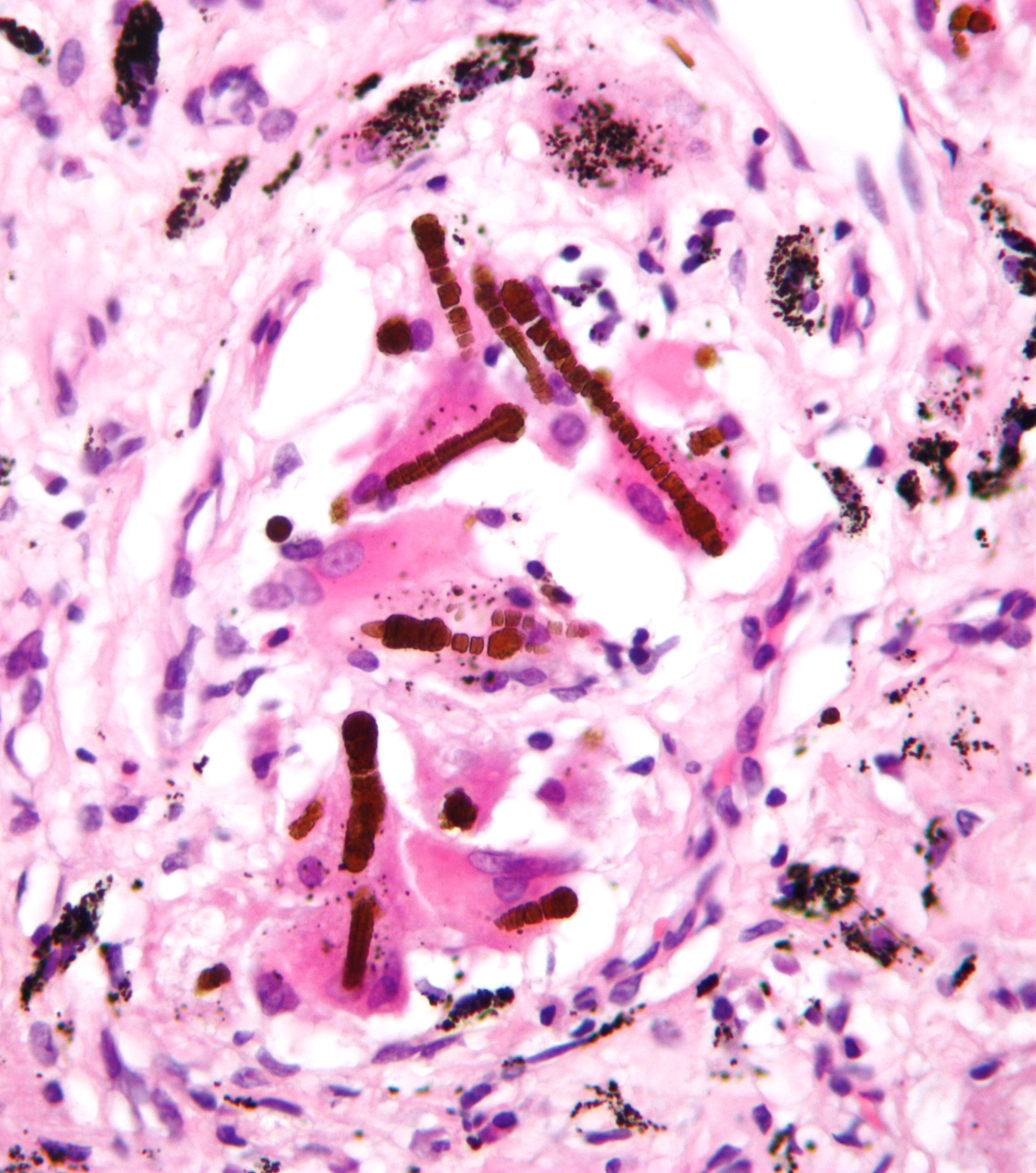
Ferruginous bodies. H&E stain.

A ferruginous body is a histopathologic finding in interstitial lung disease suggestive of significant asbestos exposure (asbestosis). Asbestos exposure is associated with occupations such as shipbuilding, roofing, plumbing, and construction.

They appear as small brown nodules in the septum of the alveolus. Ferruginous bodies are typically indicative of asbestos inhalation (when the presence of asbestos is verified they are called "asbestos bodies"). In this case they are fibers of asbestos coated with an iron-rich material derived from proteins such as ferritin and hemosiderin. Ferruginous bodies are believed to be formed by macrophages that have phagocytosed and attempted to digest the fibers.

== Additional images ==
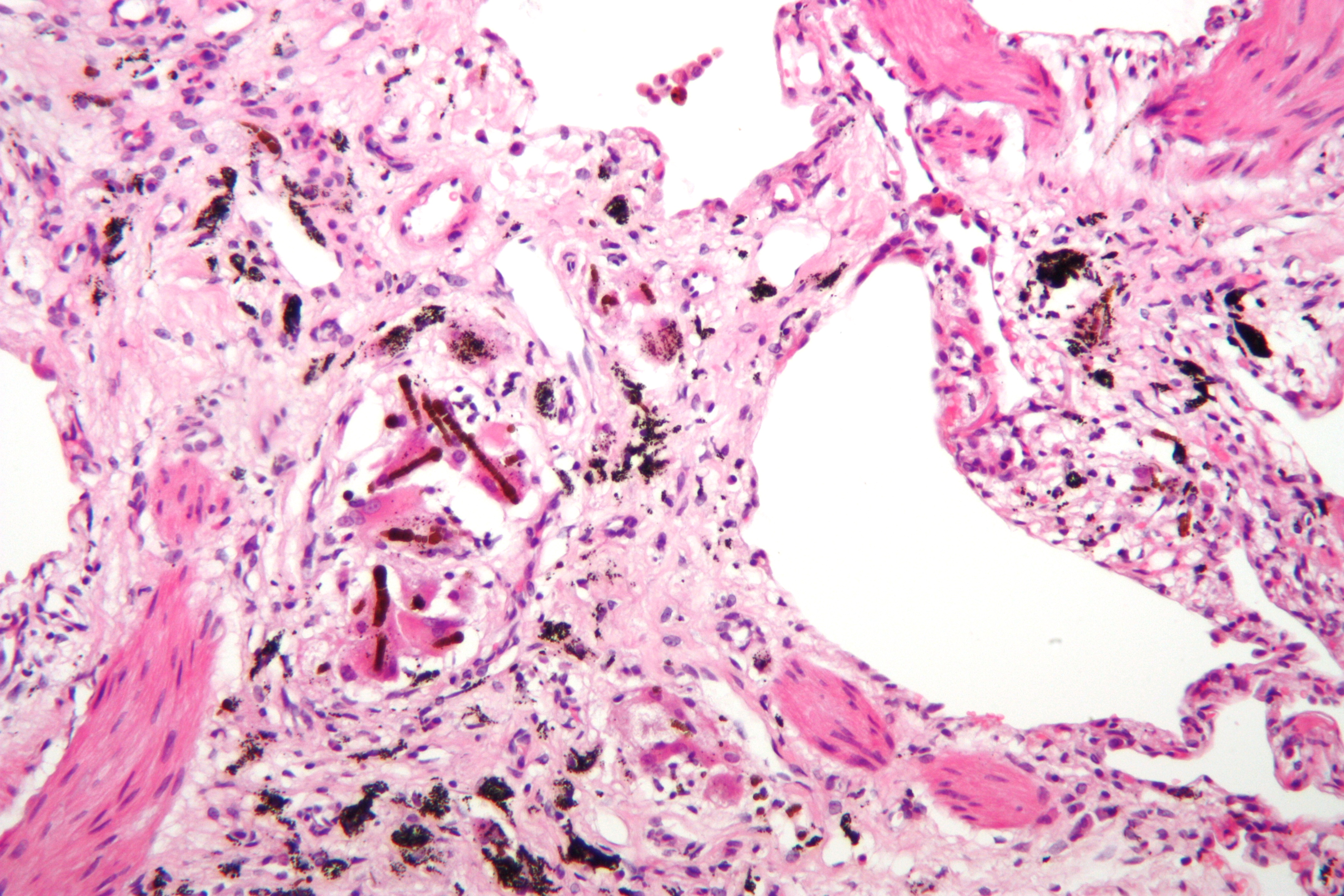
Micrograph of asbestosis with prominent ferruginous bodies. H&E stain.
