= Asbestosis =

Pneumoconiosis caused by inhalation and retention of asbestos fibers

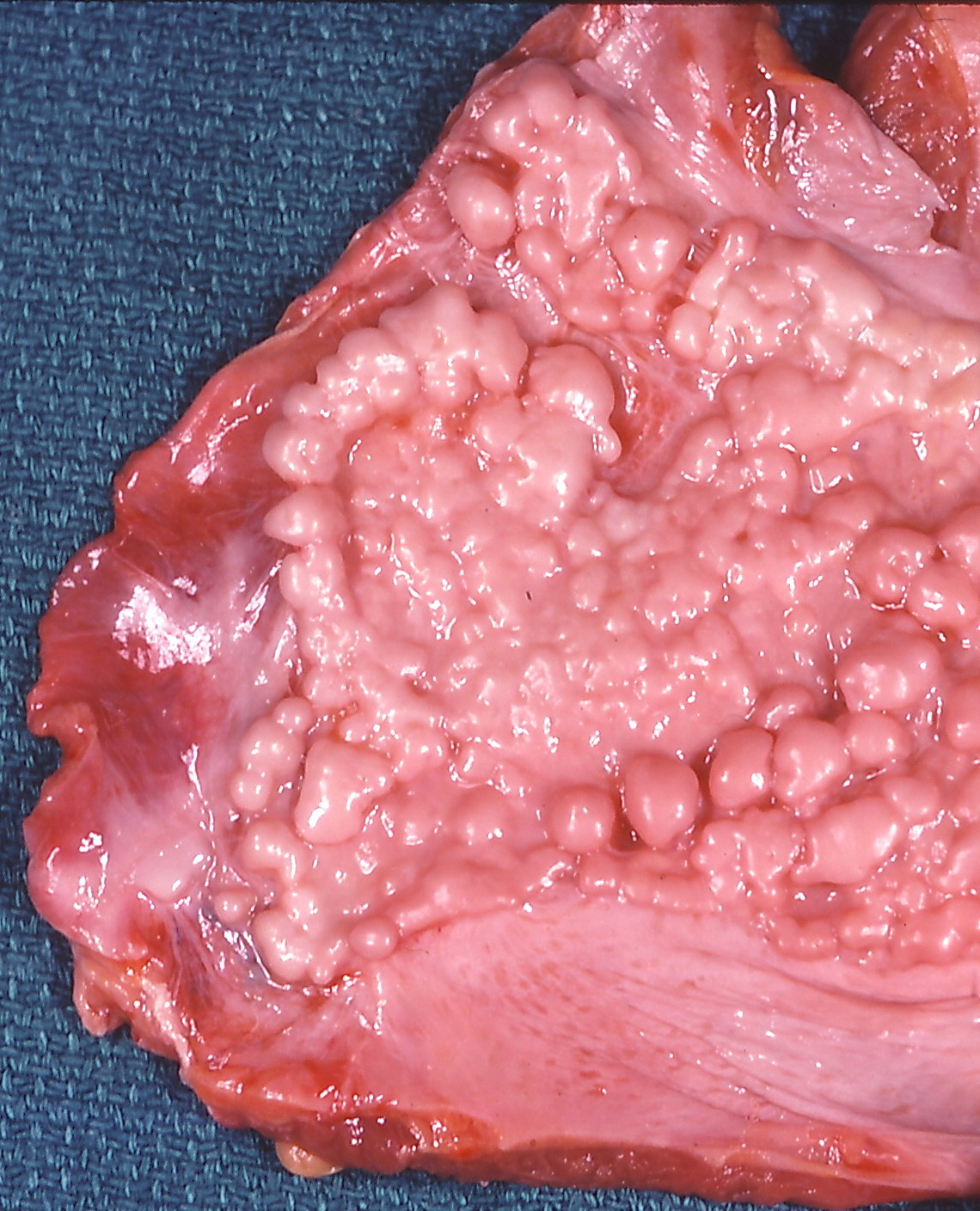
- A plaque caused by asbestos exposure on the diaphragmatic pleura
- Specialty: Pulmonology
- Symptoms: Shortness of breath, cough, wheezing, chest pain
- Complications: Lung cancer, mesothelioma, pleural fibrosis, pulmonary heart disease
- Usual onset: c. 10–40 years after long-term exposure
- Causes: Asbestos
- Diagnostic method: History of exposure, medical imaging
- Prevention: Eliminating exposure
- Treatment: Supportive care, stopping smoking, oxygen therapy, lung replacement
- Prognosis: Up to 40% continue to worsen
- Frequency: 157,000 (2015)
- Deaths: 3,600 (2015), 200,000 Annually (2024) (WHO)

Asbestosis is long-term inflammation and scarring of the lungs due to asbestos fibers. Symptoms may include shortness of breath, cough, wheezing, and chest tightness. Complications may include lung cancer, mesothelioma, and pulmonary heart disease.

Asbestosis is caused by breathing in asbestos fibers. It requires a relatively large exposure over a long period of time, which typically only occurs in those who directly work with asbestos. All types of asbestos fibers are associated with an increased risk. It is generally recommended that currently existing and undamaged asbestos be left undisturbed. Diagnosis is based upon a history of exposure together with medical imaging. Asbestosis is a type of interstitial pulmonary fibrosis.

There is no specific treatment. Recommendations may include influenza vaccination, pneumococcal vaccination, oxygen therapy, and stopping smoking. Asbestosis affected about 157,000 people and resulted in 3,600 deaths in 2015. Asbestos use has been banned in a number of countries in an effort to prevent disease.

Statistics from the UK's Health and Safety Executive showed that in 2019, there were 490 asbestosis deaths.

== Signs and symptoms ==
The signs and symptoms of asbestosis typically manifest after a significant amount of time has passed following asbestos exposure, often several decades under current conditions in the US. The primary symptom of asbestosis is generally the slow onset of shortness of breath, especially with physical activity. Clinically advanced cases of asbestosis may lead to respiratory failure. When a stethoscope is used to listen to the lungs of a person with asbestosis, they may hear inspiratory "crackles".

The characteristic pulmonary function finding in asbestosis is a restrictive ventilatory defect. This manifests as a reduction in lung volumes, particularly the vital capacity (VC) and total lung capacity (TLC). The TLC may be reduced through alveolar wall thickening; however, this is not always the case. Large airway function, as reflected by FEV_{1}/FVC, is generally well preserved. In severe cases, the drastic reduction in lung function due to the stiffening of the lungs and reduced TLC may induce right-sided heart failure (cor pulmonale). In addition to a restrictive defect, asbestosis may produce reduction in diffusion capacity and a low amount of oxygen in the blood of the arteries.

== Cause ==
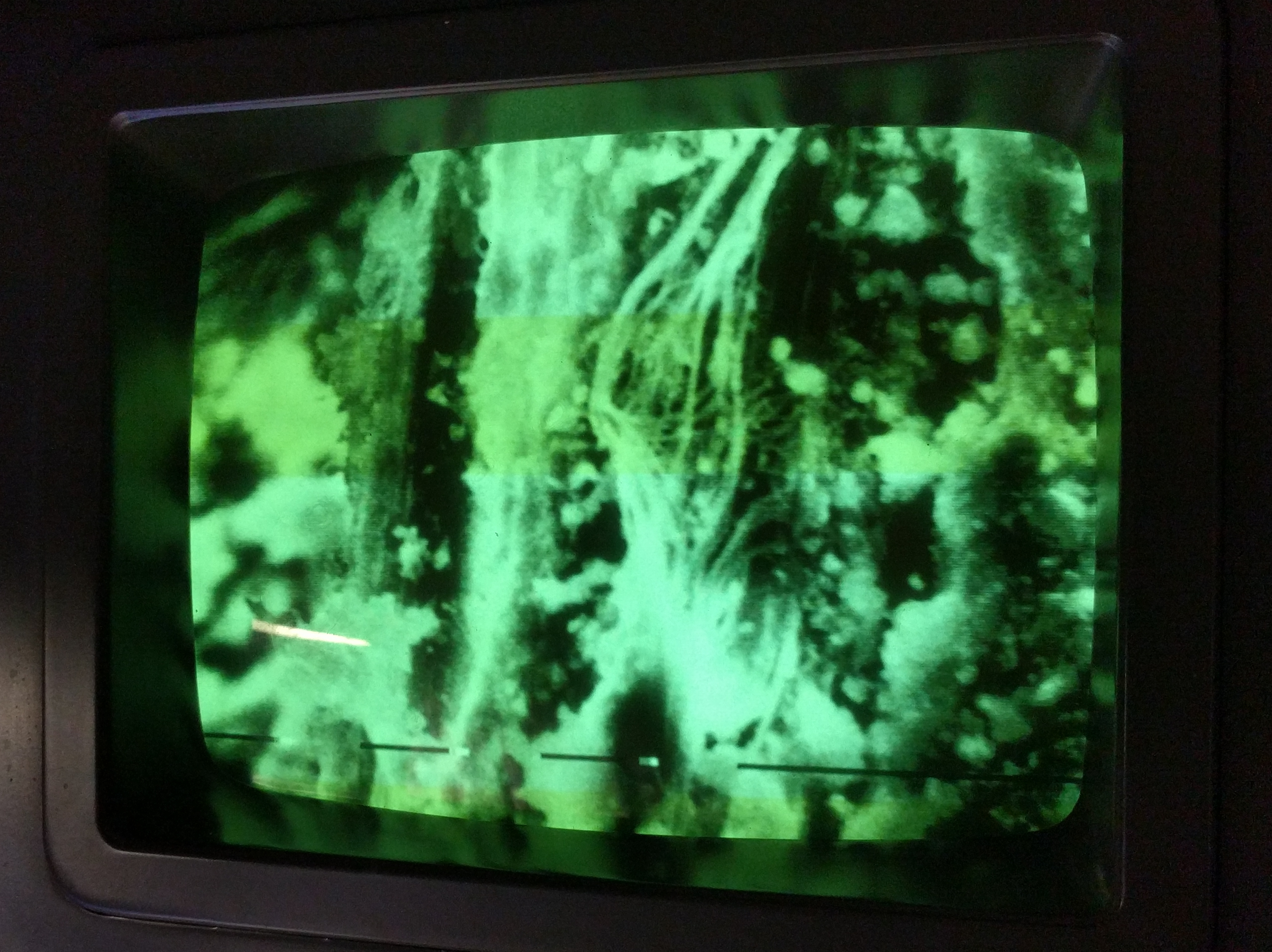
White asbestos fibers identified in room air analysis, magnified 5000 times using a scanning electron microscope

The cause of asbestosis is the inhalation of microscopic asbestos mineral fibers suspended in the air. In the 1930s, E. R. A. Merewether found that greater exposure resulted in greater risk.

== Risk factors ==
Those who worked in the production, milling, manufacturing, installation, or removal of asbestos products before the late 1970s are at an increased risk of exposure to asbestos. This includes people who worked in these jobs in the United States and Canada. For example:

- Asbestos miners
- Aeronautical and car mechanics
- Boiler operators
- Construction workers
- Electricians
- Railway workers
- Workers who remove asbestos insulation from around a steam vessel in an old building

Construction workers who inhale asbestos from contaminated building materials such as paint, spackling, roof shingles, masonry compounds, and drywall may get asbestosis. The amount and length of an individual's exposure to asbestos are the primary factors that determine the level of risk. The longer one is exposed to the substance, the higher their risk of developing lung damage.

Families of exposed workers can be affected because asbestos fibers from clothing and hair can end up in the home. People who live near mines can also be exposed to airborne asbestos fibers.

== Pathogenesis ==
Asbestosis is the scarring of lung tissue (beginning around terminal bronchioles and alveolar ducts and extending into the alveolar walls) resulting from the inhalation of asbestos fibers. There are two types of fibers: amphibole (thin and straight) and serpentine (curly). All forms of asbestos fibers are responsible for human disease as they are able to penetrate deeply into the lungs. When such fibers reach the alveoli (air sacs) in the lung, where oxygen is transferred into the blood, the foreign bodies (asbestos fibers) cause the activation of the lungs' local immune system and provoke an inflammatory reaction dominated by lung macrophages that respond to chemotactic factors activated by the fibers. This inflammatory reaction can be described as chronic rather than acute, with a slow ongoing progression of the immune system attempting to eliminate the foreign fibers. Macrophages phagocytose (ingest) the fibers and stimulate fibroblasts to deposit connective tissue.

Due to the asbestos fibers' natural resistance to digestion, some macrophages release inflammatory chemical signals, and other macrophages are killed, releasing reactive oxygen species and activating transcription factors, like NF-κB, which amplify the expression of pro-inflammatory cytokines. These inflammatory chemical signals attract further lung macrophages and fibrolastic cells that synthesize fibrous scar tissue, which eventually becomes diffuse and can progress in heavily exposed individuals. This tissue can be seen microscopically soon after exposure in animal models. Some asbestos fibers become layered by an iron-containing proteinaceous material (ferruginous body) in cases of heavy exposure where about 10% of the fibers become coated. Most inhaled asbestos fibers remain uncoated. About 20% of the inhaled fibers are transported by cytoskeletal components of the alveolar epithelium to the interstitial compartment of the lung where they interact with macrophages and mesenchymal cells. The cytokines, transforming growth factor beta and tumor necrosis factor alpha, appear to play major roles in the development of scarring inasmuch as the process can be blocked in animal models by preventing the expression of the growth factors. The result is fibrosis in the interstitial space, thus asbestosis.

This fibrotic scarring causes alveolar walls to thicken, which reduces elasticity and gas diffusion, reducing oxygen transfer to the blood as well as the removal of carbon dioxide. This can result in shortness of breath, a common symptom exhibited by individuals with asbestosis. Those with asbestosis may be more vulnerable to tumor growth (mesothelioma), because asbestos decreases the cytotoxicity of natural killer cells and impairs the functioning of T helper cells, which detect abnormal cell growth.

== Diagnosis ==
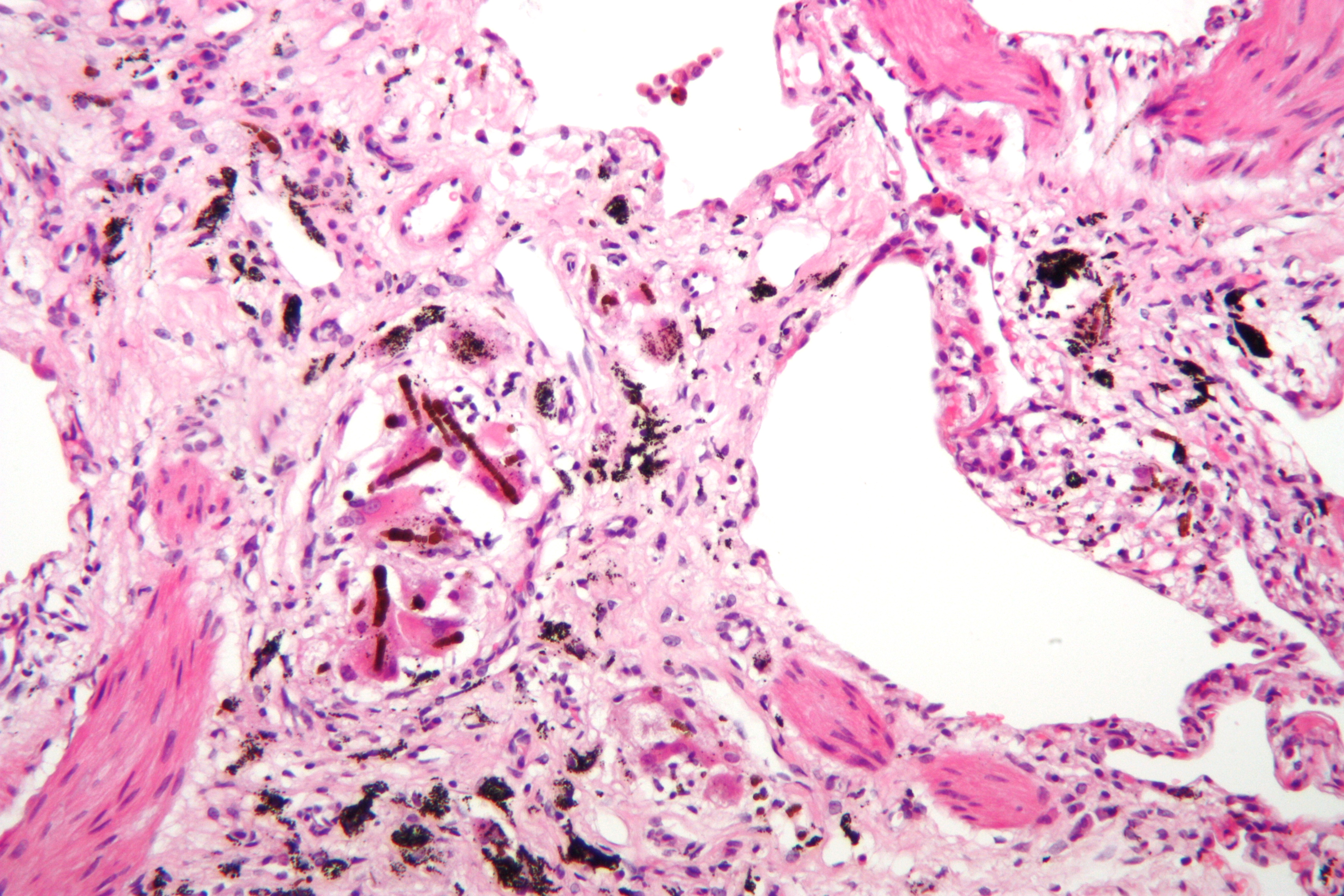
Micrograph of asbestosis showing the characteristic ferruginous bodies and marked interstitial fibrosis (or scarring). H&E stain.

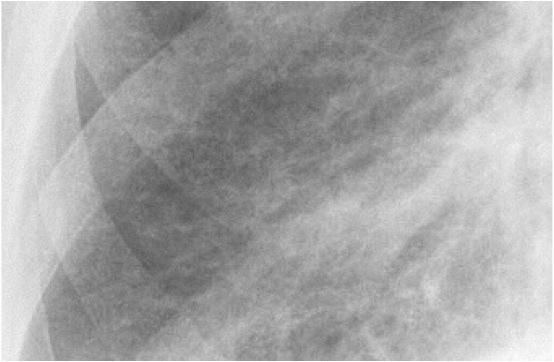
Close-up asbestosis right lower zone ILO 2/2 S/S

Lateral chest X-ray in asbestosis shows plaquing of the diaphragm

According to the American Thoracic Society (ATS), the general diagnostic criteria for asbestosis are:

- Evidence of structural pathology consistent with asbestosis, as documented by imaging or histology
- Evidence of causation by asbestos as documented by the occupational and environmental history, markers of exposure (usually pleural plaques), recovery of asbestos bodies, or other means
- Exclusion of alternative plausible causes for the findings

The abnormal chest x-ray and its interpretation remain the most important factors in establishing the presence of pulmonary fibrosis. The findings usually appear as small, irregular parenchymal opacities, primarily in the lung bases. Using the ILO Classification system, "s", "t", and/or "u" opacities predominate. CT or high-resolution CT (HRCT) are more sensitive than plain radiography at detecting pulmonary fibrosis (as well as any underlying pleural changes). More than 50% of people affected with asbestosis develop plaques in the parietal pleura, the space between the chest wall and lungs. Once apparent, the radiographic findings in asbestosis may slowly progress or remain static, even in the absence of further asbestos exposure. Rapid progression suggests an alternative diagnosis.

Asbestosis resembles many other diffuse interstitial lung diseases, including other pneumoconiosis. The differential diagnosis includes idiopathic pulmonary fibrosis (IPF), hypersensitivity pneumonitis, sarcoidosis, and others. The presence of pleural plaques may provide supportive evidence of causation by asbestos. Although lung biopsy is usually not necessary, the presence of asbestos bodies in association with pulmonary fibrosis establishes the diagnosis. Conversely, interstitial pulmonary fibrosis in the absence of asbestos bodies is most likely not asbestosis. Asbestos bodies in the absence of fibrosis indicate exposure, not disease.

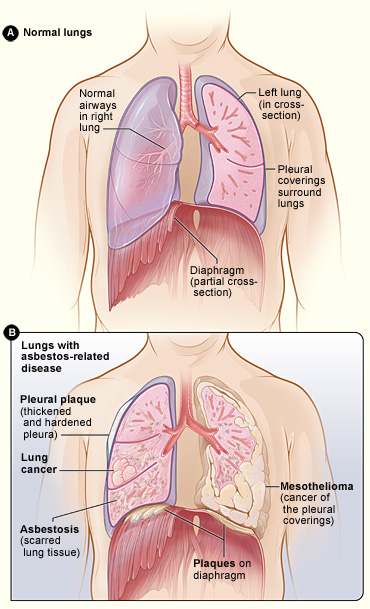
Figure A shows the location of the lungs, airways, pleura, and diaphragm in the body. Figure B shows lungs with asbestos-related diseases, including pleural plaque, lung cancer, asbestosis, plaque on the diaphragm, and mesothelioma.

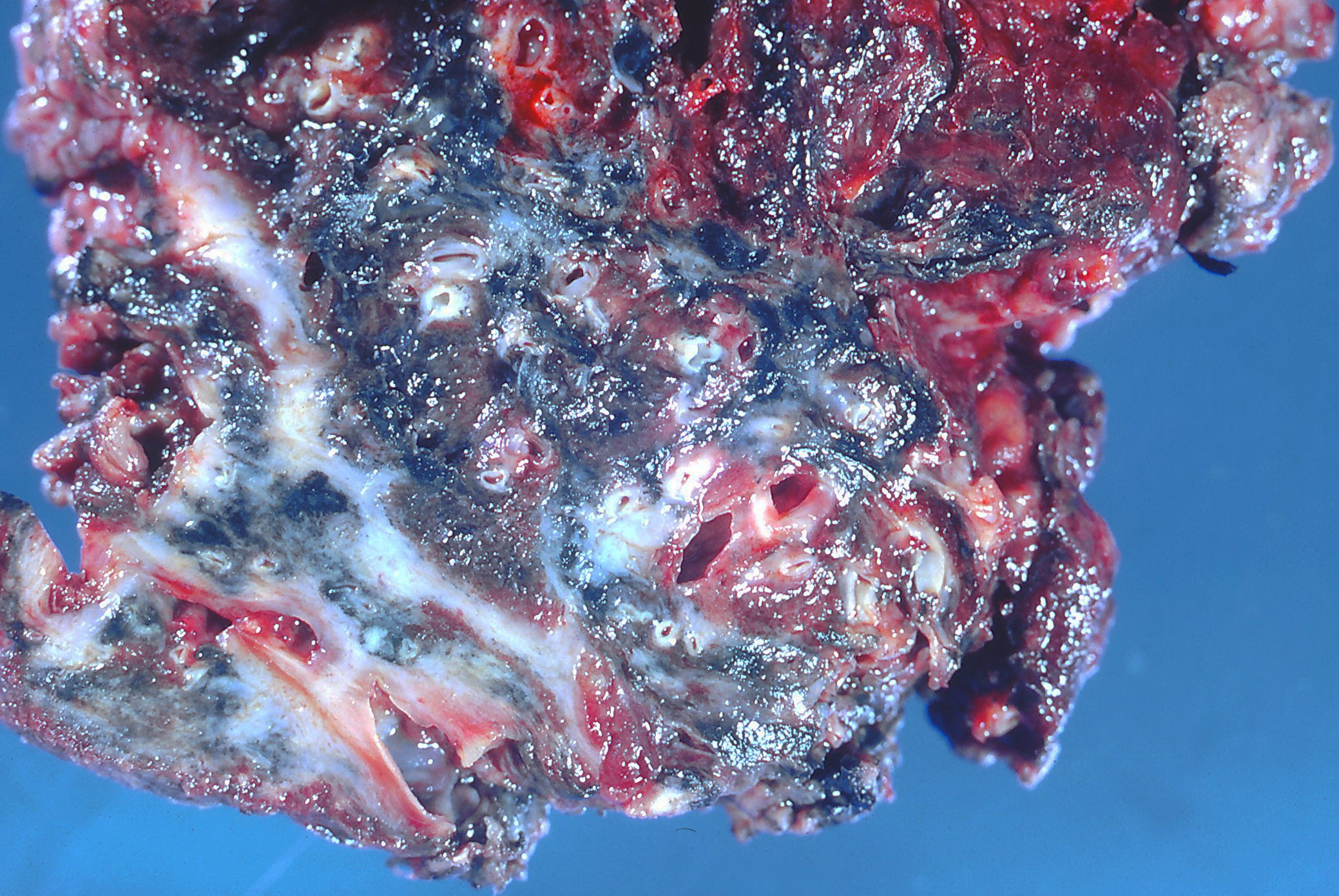
Extensive fibrosis of pleura and lung parenchyma

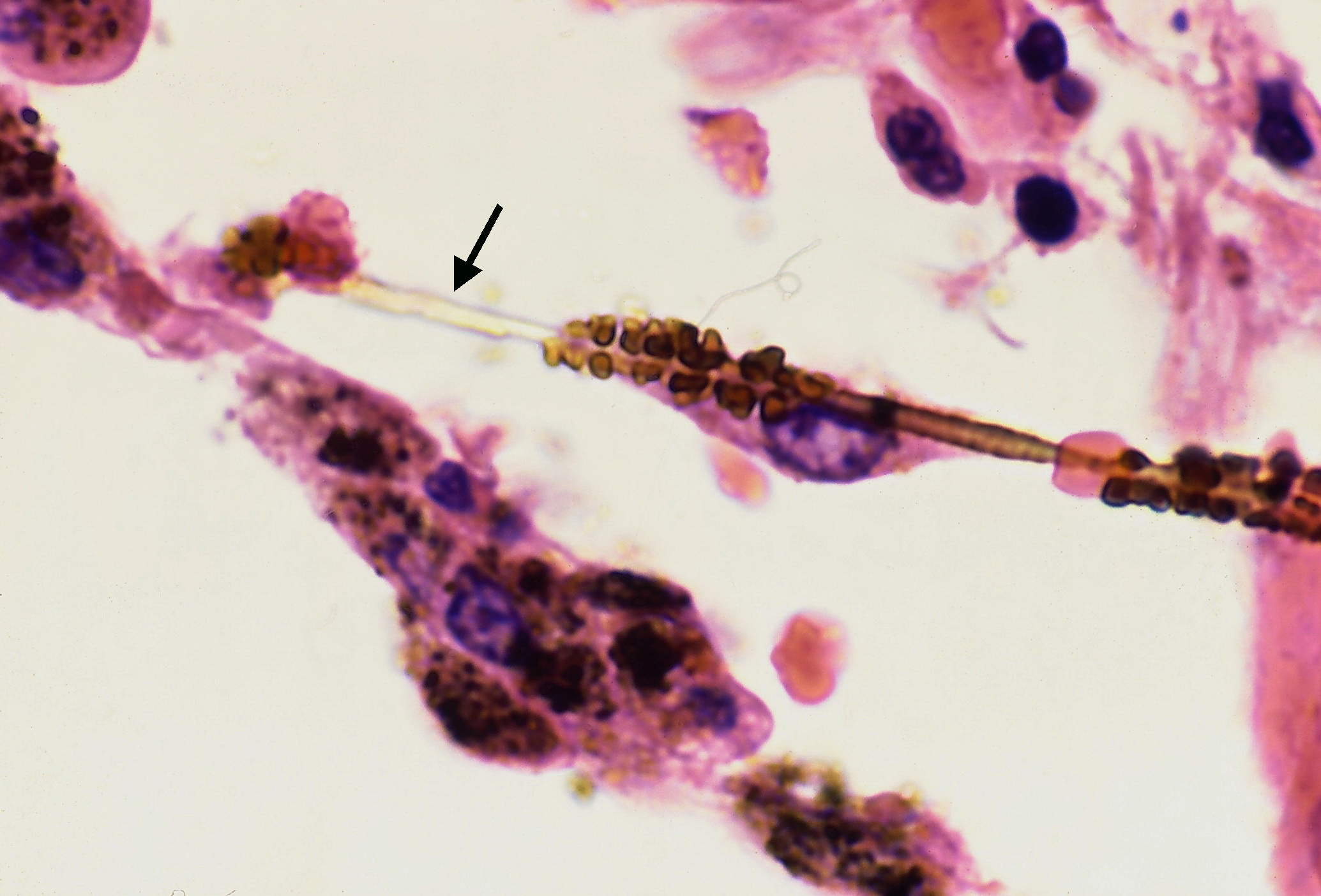
The arrow points to an uncoated segment of asbestos fiber in this ferruginous body.

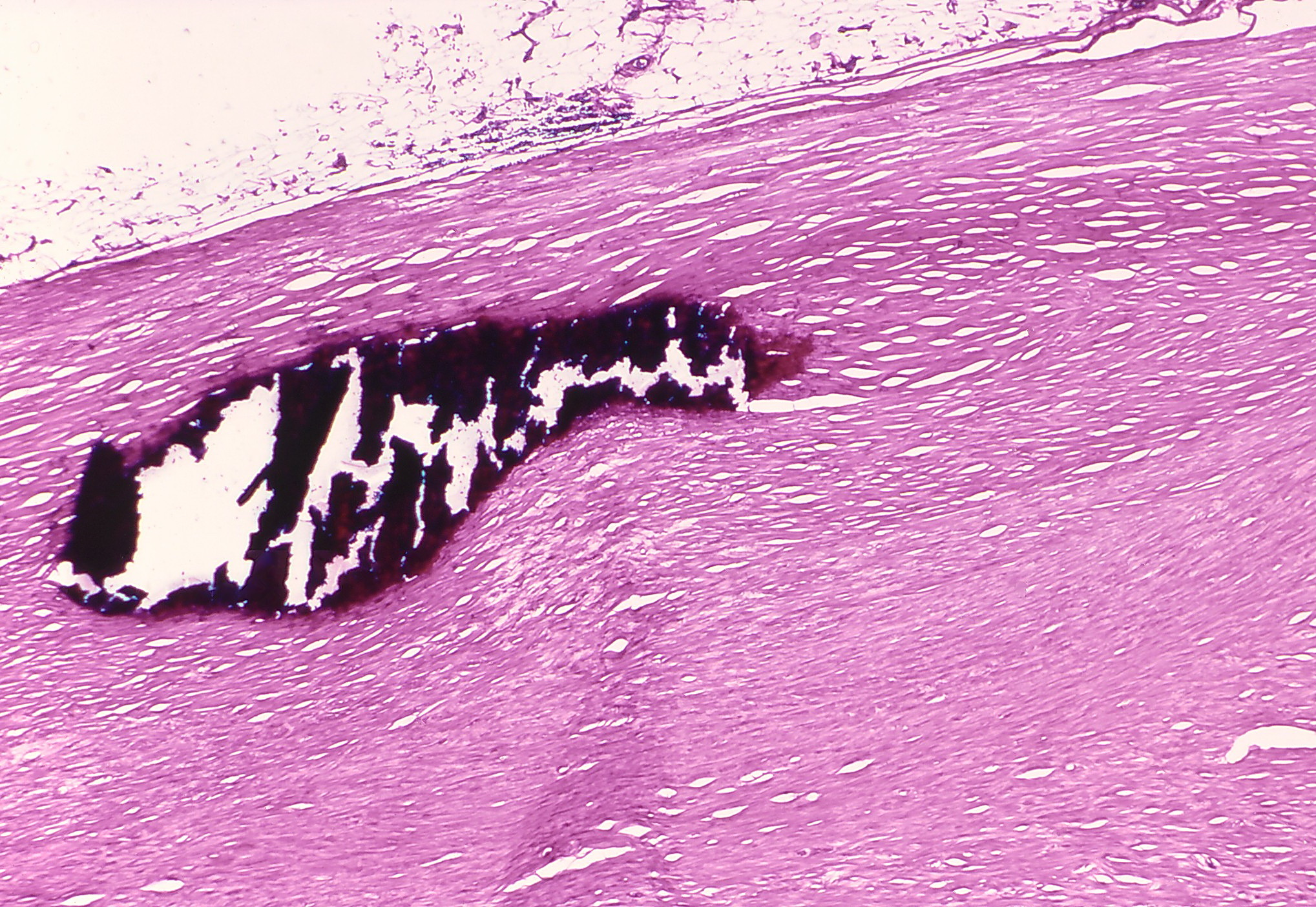
Severe pleural fibrosis with focal calcification

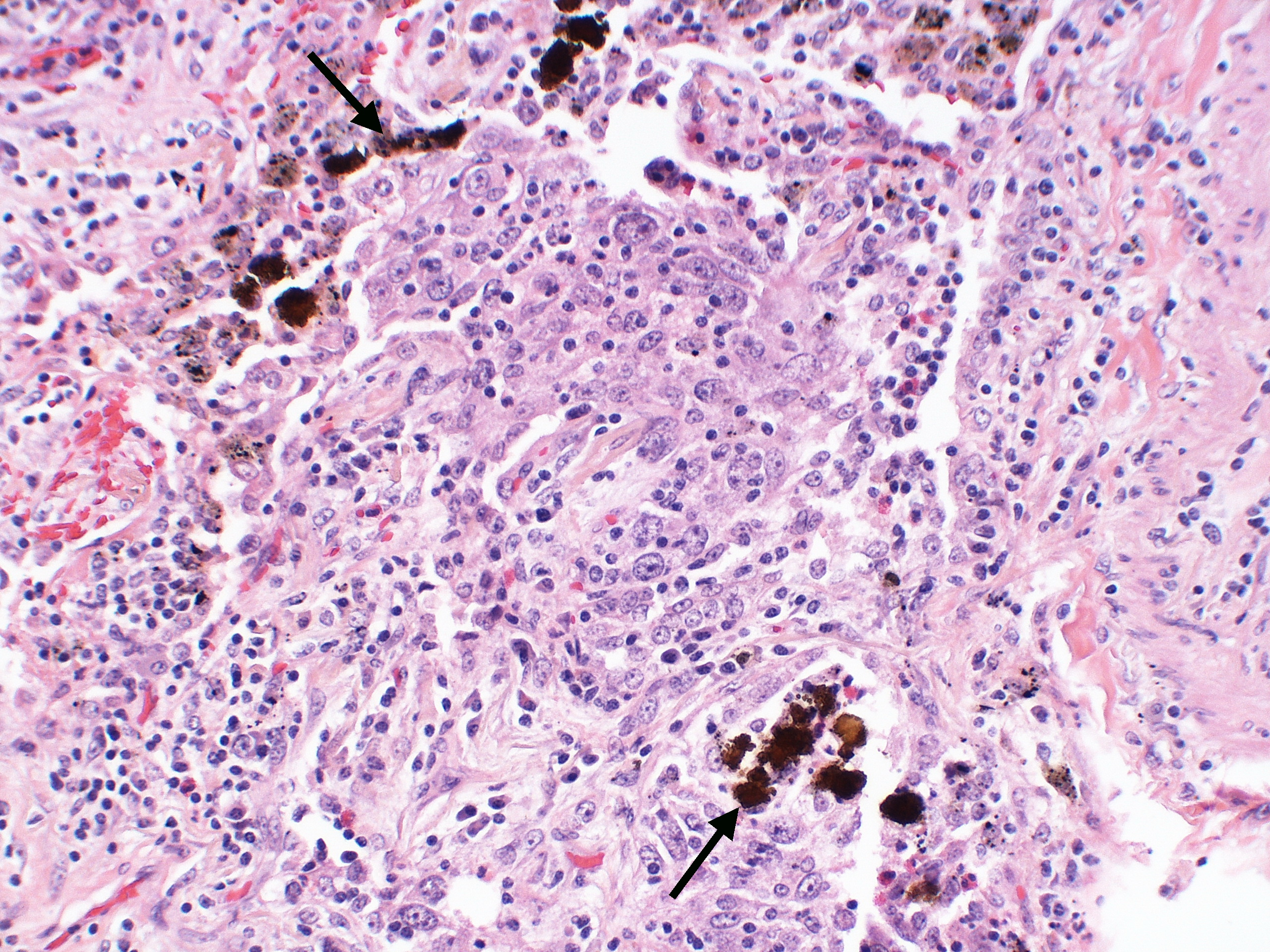
The black arrows point to ferrugionous bodies that are located at the periphery of a focus of non-small cell lung carcinoma, NOS.

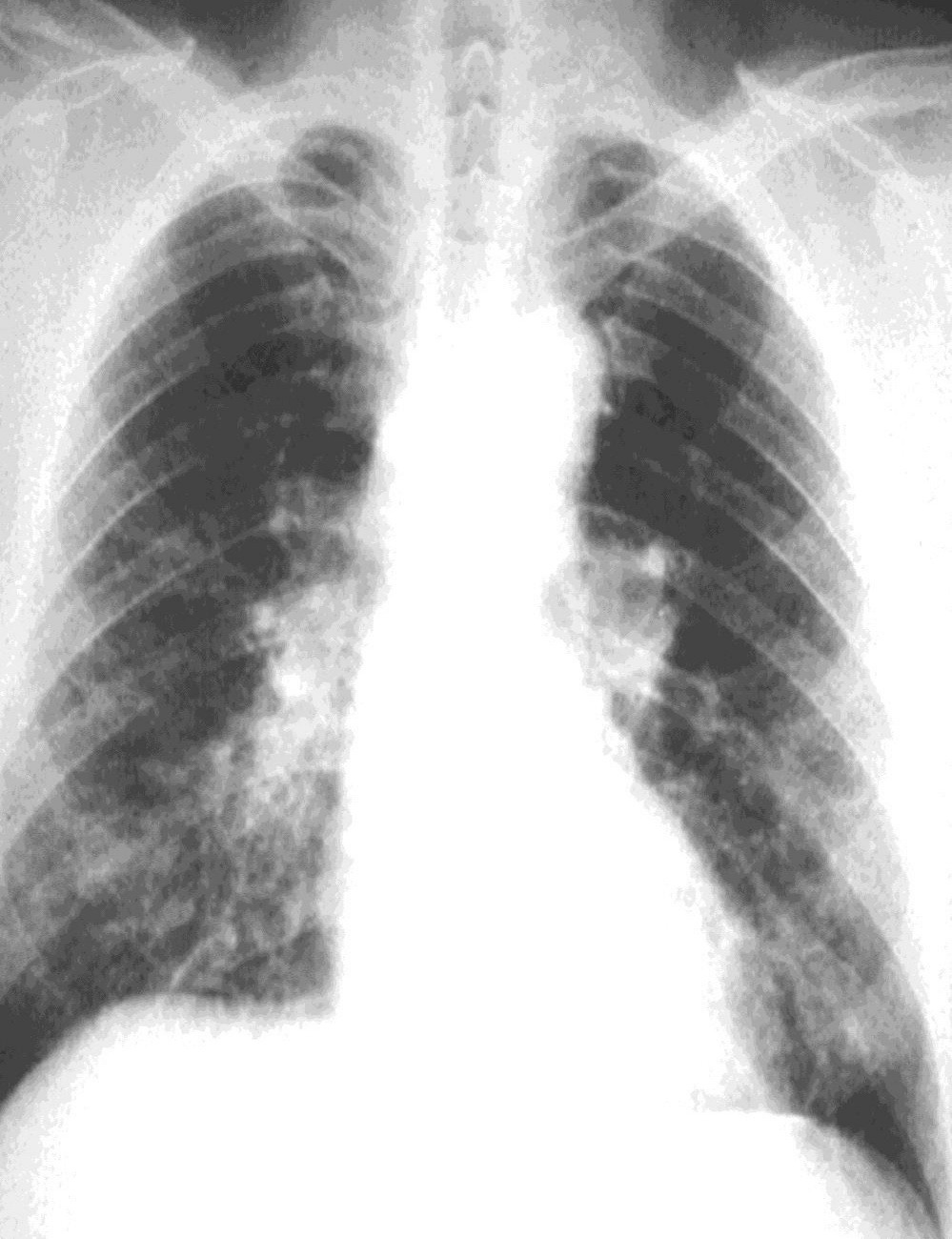
61-year-old working industrially with asbestos for decades

== Treatment ==
There is no cure available for asbestosis. Oxygen therapy at home is often necessary to relieve the shortness of breath and correct underlying low blood oxygen levels. Supportive treatment of symptoms includes respiratory physiotherapy to remove secretions from the lungs by postural drainage, chest percussion, and vibration. Nebulized medications may be prescribed in order to loosen secretions or treat underlying chronic obstructive pulmonary disease. Immunization against pneumococcal pneumonia and annual influenza vaccination is administered due to increased sensitivity to the diseases. Those with asbestosis are at increased risk for certain cancers. If the person smokes, quitting the habit reduces further damage. Periodic pulmonary function tests, chest x-rays, and clinical evaluations, including cancer screening/evaluations, are given to detect additional hazards.

== Society and culture ==
=== Legal issues ===
On 21 December 1906 H. Montague Murray, M.D., F.R.C.P., testified before a British committee concerning a patient who died in April 1900. Murray indicated that fibrosis of the lungs caused by asbestos dust was a plausible cause of the patient's death.

The death of English textile worker Nellie Kershaw in 1924 from pulmonary asbestosis was the first case to be described in medical literature, and the first published account of disease definitely attributed to occupational asbestos exposure. However, her former employers (Turner Brothers Asbestos) denied that asbestosis even existed because the medical condition was not officially recognised at the time. As a result, they accepted no liability for her injuries and paid no compensation, either to Kershaw during her final illness or to her family after her death. Even so, the findings of the inquest into her death were highly influential insofar as they led to a parliamentary enquiry by the British Parliament. The enquiry formally acknowledged the existence of asbestosis, recognised that it was hazardous to health and concluded that it was irrefutably linked to the prolonged inhalation of asbestos dust. Having established the existence of asbestosis on a medical and judicial basis, the report resulted in the first Asbestos Industry Regulations being published in 1931, which came into effect on 1 March 1932.

The first lawsuits against asbestos manufacturers occurred in 1929. Since then, many lawsuits have been filed against asbestos manufacturers and employers, for neglecting to implement safety measures after the link between asbestos, asbestosis and mesothelioma became known (some reports seem to place this as early as 1898 in modern times). The liability resulting from the sheer number of lawsuits and people affected has reached billions of U.S. dollars. The amounts and method of allocating compensation have been the source of many court cases, and government attempts at resolution of existing and future cases.

To date, about 100 companies have declared bankruptcy at least partially due to asbestos-related liability. In accordance with Chapter 11 and § 524(g) of the U.S. federal bankruptcy code, a company may transfer its liabilities and certain assets to an asbestos personal injury trust, which is then responsible for compensating present and future claimants. Since 1988, 60 trusts have been established to pay claims with about $37 billion in total assets. From 1988 through 2010, analysis from the United States Government Accountability Office indicates that trusts have paid about 3.3 million claims valued at about $17.5 billion.

== Notable people ==
This is a partial list of notable people who have died from lung fibrosis associated with asbestos:

- Bernie Banton, social justice advocate
- Paul Gleason, Breakfast Club actor
- Nellie Kershaw, first person diagnosed with asbestos-related disease, 1924
- John MacDougall, politician
- Steve McQueen, actor
- Theodore Sturgeon, writer
