= Iron oxide =

Class of chemical compounds composed of iron and oxygen

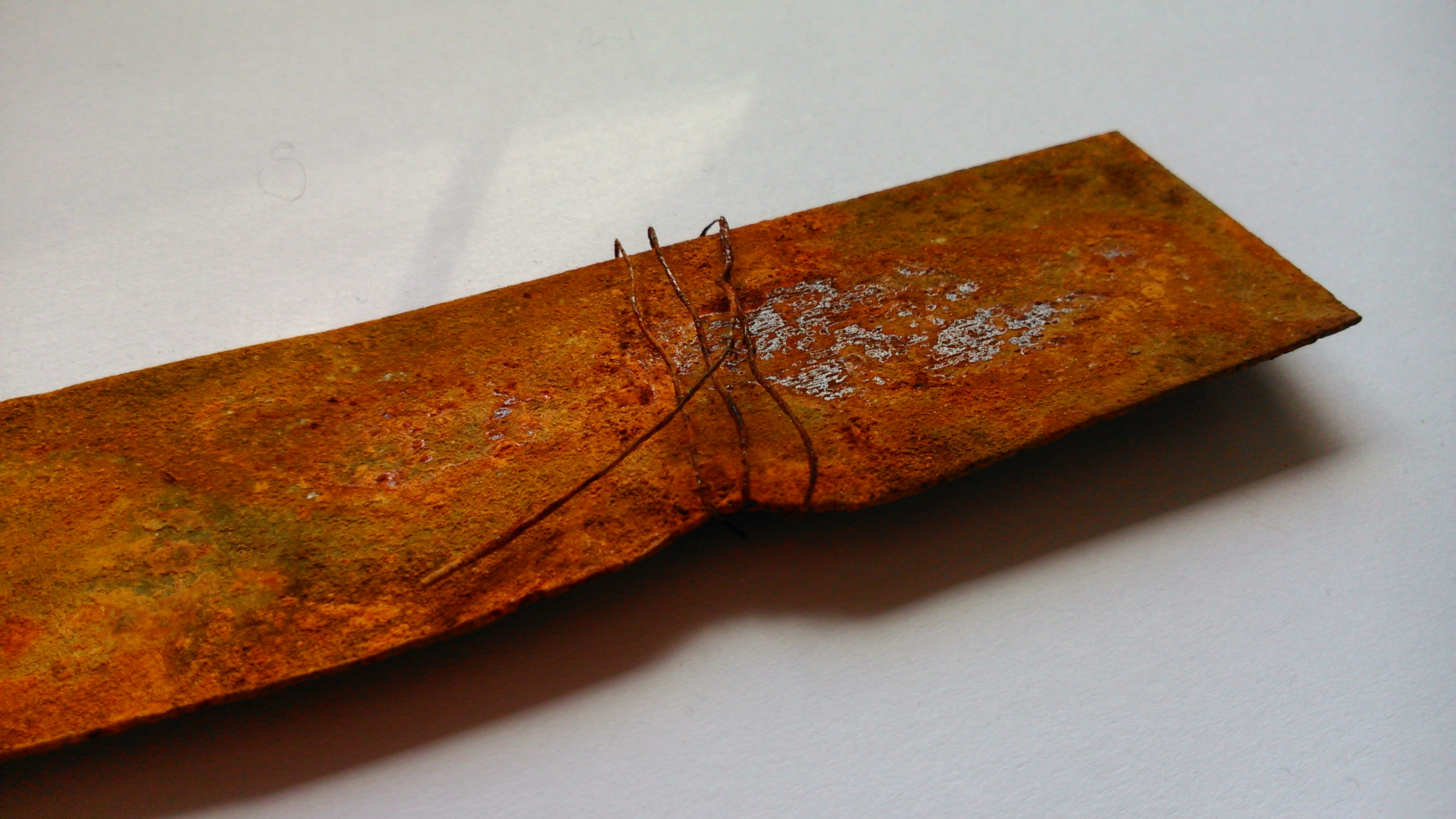
Electrochemically oxidized iron (rust)

A burning iron sponge reacts with oxygen in the air, producing iron(II,III) oxide

An iron oxide is a chemical compound composed of iron and oxygen. Several iron oxides are recognized. Often they are non-stoichiometric. Ferric oxyhydroxides are a related class of compounds, perhaps the best known of which is rust.

Iron oxides and oxyhydroxides are widespread in nature and play an important role in many geological and biological processes. They are used as iron ores, pigments, catalysts, and in thermite. Iron oxides are inexpensive and durable pigments in paints, coatings and colored concretes. Colors commonly available are in the "earthy" end of the yellow/orange/red/brown/black range. When used as a food coloring, it has E number E172.

The earliest applications of paint served purely ornamental purposes. Consequently, pigment lacking any adhesive agent—composed mainly of iron oxide—was employed in prehistoric cave art around the 15,000s BC in parts of Asia.

== Stoichiometries ==
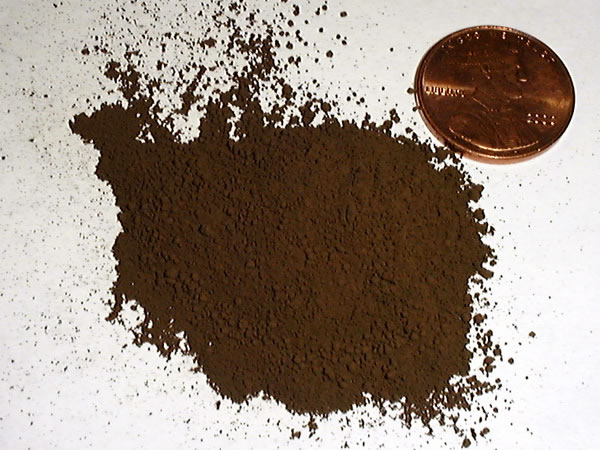
The brown color of this iron oxide pigment indicates that iron is at the oxidation state +3.

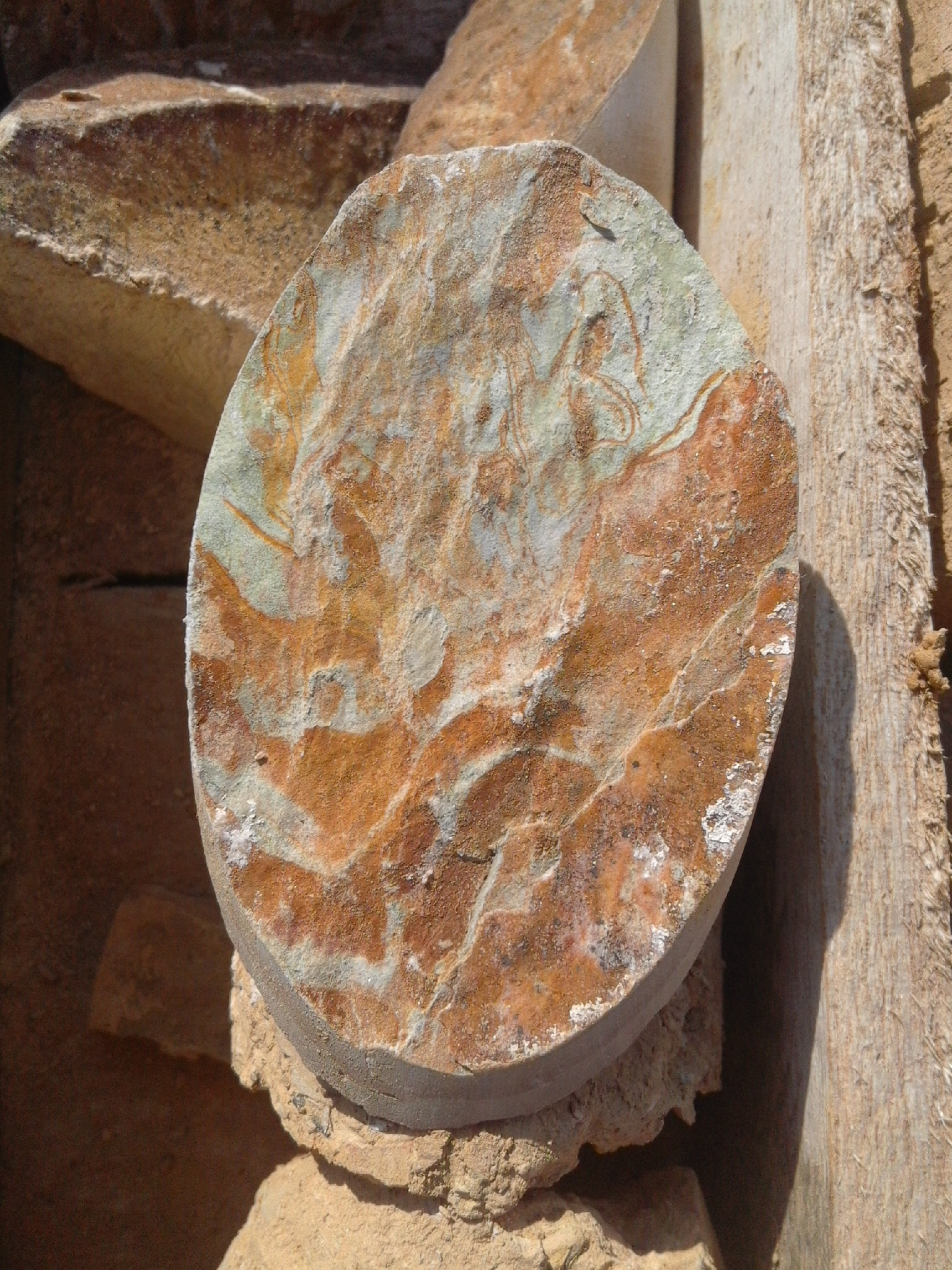
Green and reddish brown stains on a limestone core sample, respectively corresponding to oxides/hydroxides of Fe^{2+} and Fe^{3+}.

Iron oxides feature as ferrous (Fe(II)) or ferric (Fe(III)) or both. They adopt octahedral or tetrahedral coordination geometry. Only a few oxides are significant at the earth's surface, particularly wüstite, magnetite, and hematite.

- Oxides of Fe^{II}
  - FeO: iron(II) oxide, wüstite
- Mixed oxides of Fe^{II} and Fe^{III}
  - Fe_{3}O_{4}: Iron(II,III) oxide, magnetite
  - Fe_{4}O_{5}
  - Fe_{5}O_{6}
  - Fe_{5}O_{7}
  - Fe_{25}O_{32}
  - Fe_{13}O_{19}
- Oxides of Fe^{III}
  - Fe_{2}O_{3}: iron(III) oxide
    - α-Fe_{2}O_{3}: alpha phase, hematite
    - β-Fe_{2}O_{3}: beta phase
    - γ-Fe_{2}O_{3}: gamma phase, maghemite
    - ε-Fe_{2}O_{3}: epsilon phase

== Thermal expansion ==
Iron oxide	CTE (× 10^{−6} °C^{−1})
Fe_{2}O_{3}	14.9
Fe_{3}O_{4}	>9.2
FeO	12.1

== Oxide-hydroxides ==
- goethite (α-FeOOH)
- akaganéite (β-FeOOH)
- lepidocrocite (γ-FeOOH)
- feroxyhyte (δ-FeOOH)
- ferrihydrite (Fe_{5}HO_{8} · 4 H_{2}O approx., or 5 Fe_{2}O_{3} · 9 H_{2}O, better recast as FeOOH · 0.4 H_{2}O)
- high-pressure pyrite-structured FeOOH. Once dehydration is triggered, this phase may form FeO_{2}H_{x} (0 < x < 1).
- green rust (Fe^{III}_{x}Fe^{II}_{y}OH_{3x + y − z} (A^{−})_{z} where A^{−} is Cl^{−} or 0.5 SO^{2−}_{4})

== Reactions ==
In blast furnaces and related factories, iron oxides are converted to the metal. Typical reducing agents are various forms of carbon. A representative reaction starts with ferric oxide:

2 Fe_{2}O_{3} + 3 C → 4 Fe + 3 CO_{2}

=== In nature ===
Iron is stored in many organisms in the form of ferritin, which is a ferrous oxide encased in a solubilizing protein sheath.

Species of bacteria, including Shewanella oneidensis, Geobacter sulfurreducens and Geobacter metallireducens, use iron oxides as terminal electron acceptors.

== Uses ==
Almost all iron ores are oxides, so in that sense these materials are important precursors to iron metal and its many alloys.

Iron oxides are important pigments, coming in a variety of colors (black, red, yellow). Among their many advantages, they are inexpensive, strongly colored, and nontoxic.

Magnetite is a component of magnetic recording tapes.

Iron oxide is also a component of iron-air batteries.

== See also ==
- Great Oxidation Event
- Iron cycle
- Iron oxide nanoparticle
- Limonite
- List of inorganic pigments
- Iron(II) hydroxide
