= Ferrihydrite =

Iron oxyhydroxide mineral

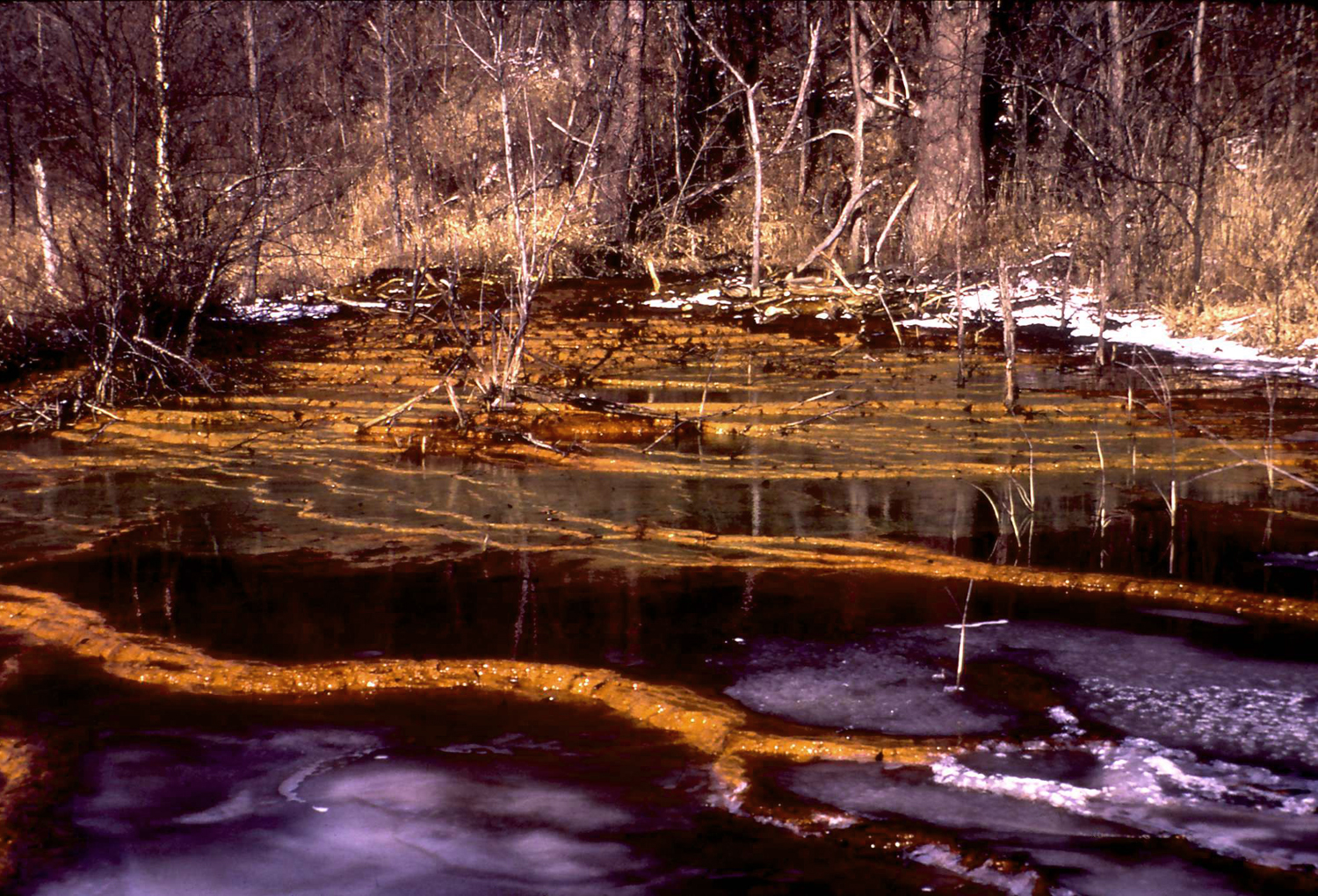
- Mine drainage from Ohio. The orange coating on the logs is ferrihydrite.

General
- Category: Oxide minerals
- Formula: (Fe^{3+})_{2}O_{3}·0.5H_{2}O
- IMA symbol: Fhy
- Strunz classification: 4.FE.35
- Dana classification: 04.03.02.02
- Crystal system: Hexagonal
- Crystal class: Dihexagonal pyramidal (6mm); H-M symbol: (6mm)
- Space group: P6_{3}mc
- Unit cell: a = 5.958, c = 8.965 [Å]; Z = 1

Identification
- Formula mass: 168.70 g/mol
- Color: Dark brown, yellow-brown
- Crystal habit: Aggregates, microscopic crystals
- Streak: Yellow-brown
- Diaphaneity: Opaque
- Density: 3.8 g/cm^{3}

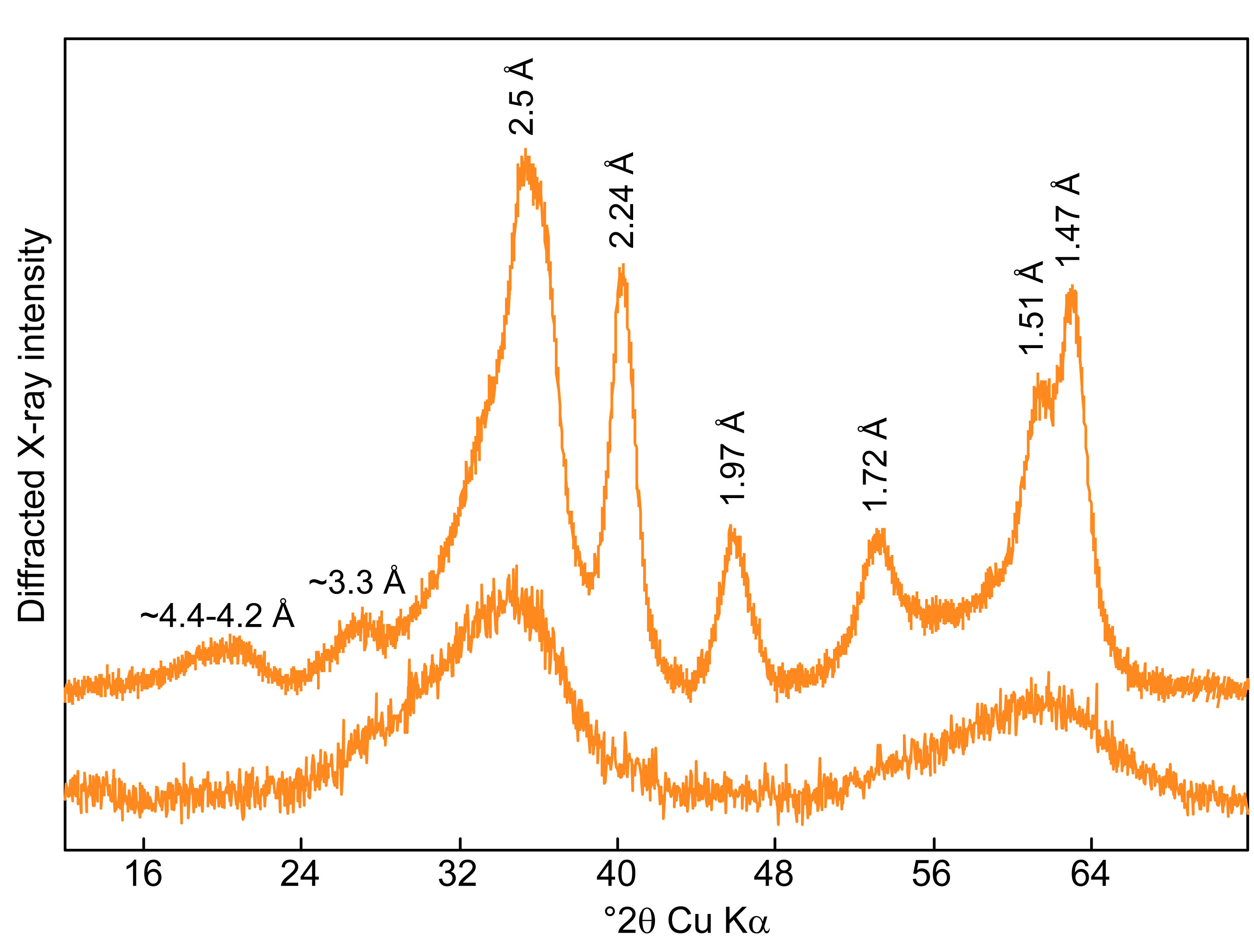
X-ray diffraction patterns for six-line (top) and two-line (bottom) ferrihydrite. Cu Kα radiation.

Ferrihydrite (Fh) is a widespread hydrous ferric oxyhydroxide mineral at the Earth's surface, and a likely constituent in extraterrestrial materials. It forms in several types of environments, from freshwater to marine systems, aquifers to hydrothermal hot springs and scales, soils, and areas affected by mining. It can be precipitated directly from oxygenated iron-rich aqueous solutions, or by bacteria either as a result of a metabolic activity or passive sorption of dissolved iron followed by nucleation reactions. Ferrihydrite also occurs in the core of the ferritin protein from many living organisms, for the purpose of intra-cellular iron storage.

== Structure ==
Ferrihydrite only exists as a fine grained and highly defective nanomaterial. The powder X-ray diffraction pattern of Fh contains two scattering bands in its most disordered state, and a maximum of six strong lines in its most crystalline state. The principal difference between these two diffraction end-members, commonly named two-line and six-line ferrihydrites, is the size of the constitutive crystallites. The six-line form has been classified as a mineral by the IMA in 1973 with the nominal chemical formula 5Fe_{2}O_{3}·9H_{2}O. Other proposed formulas are Fe_{5}HO_{8}·4H_{2}O and Fe_{2}O_{3}·2FeO(OH)·2.6H_{2}O. However, its formula is fundamentally indeterminate as its water content is variable. The two-line form is also called hydrous ferric oxides (HFO).

Due to the nanoparticulate nature of ferrihydrite, the structure has remained elusive for many years and is still a matter of controversy. Drits et al., using X-ray diffraction data, proposed in 1993 a multiphase structure model for six-line ferrihydrite with three components: (1) defect-free crystallites (f-phase) with double-hexagonal stacking of oxygen and hydroxyl layers (ABAC sequence) and disordered octahedral Fe occupancies, (2) defective crystallites (d-phase) with a short-range feroxyhite-like (δ-FeOOH) structure, and (3) subordinate ultradisperse hematite (α-Fe_{2}O_{3}). The diffraction model has been confirmed in 2002 by neutron diffraction, and the three components were observed by high-resolution transmission electron microscopy. A single phase model for both ferrihydrite and hydromaghemite has been proposed by Michel et al., in 2007–2010, based on pair distribution function (PDF) analysis of x-ray total scattering data. The structural model, isostructural with the mineral akdalaite (Al_{10}O_{14}(OH)_{2}), contains 20% tetrahedrally and 80% octahedrally coordinated iron. Manceau et al. showed in 2014 that the Drits et al. model reproduces the PDF data as well as the Michel et al. model, and he suggested in 2019 that the tetrahedral coordination arises from maghemite and magnetite impurities observed by electron microscopy.

== Porosity and environmental absorbent potential ==
Because of the small size of individual nanocrystals, Fh is nanoporous yielding large surface areas of several hundred square meters per gram. In addition to having a high surface area to volume ratio, Fh also has a high density of local or point defects, such as dangling bonds and vacancies. These properties confer a high ability to adsorb many environmentally important chemical species, including arsenic, lead, phosphate, and organic molecules (e.g., humic and fulvic acids). Its strong and extensive interaction with trace metals and metalloids is used in industry, at large-scale in water purification plants, as in North Germany and to produce the city water at Hiroshima, and at small scale to clean wastewaters and groundwaters, for example to remove arsenic from industrial effluents and drinking water. Its nanoporosity and high affinity for gold can be used to elaborate Fh-supported nanosized Au particles for the catalytic oxidation of CO at temperatures below 0 °C. Dispersed six-line ferrihydrite nanoparticles can be entrapped in a vesicular state to increase their stability. Presence of ferrihydrite can enhance growth of certain microbes, eg. Dissulfuribacter thermophilus, by scavenging sulfide, a waste product of their metabolism.

== Metastability ==
Ferrihydrite is a metastable mineral. It is known to be a precursor of more crystalline minerals like hematite and goethite by aggregation-based crystal growth. However, its transformation in natural systems generally is blocked by chemical impurities adsorbed at its surface, for example silica as most of natural ferrihydrites are siliceous.

Under reducing conditions as those found in gley soils, or in deep environments depleted in oxygen, and often with the assistance of microbial activity, ferrihydrite can be transformed in green rust, a layered double hydroxide (LDH), also known as the mineral fougerite. However, a short exposure of green rust to atmospheric oxygen is sufficient to oxidize it back to ferrihydrite, making it a very elusive compound.

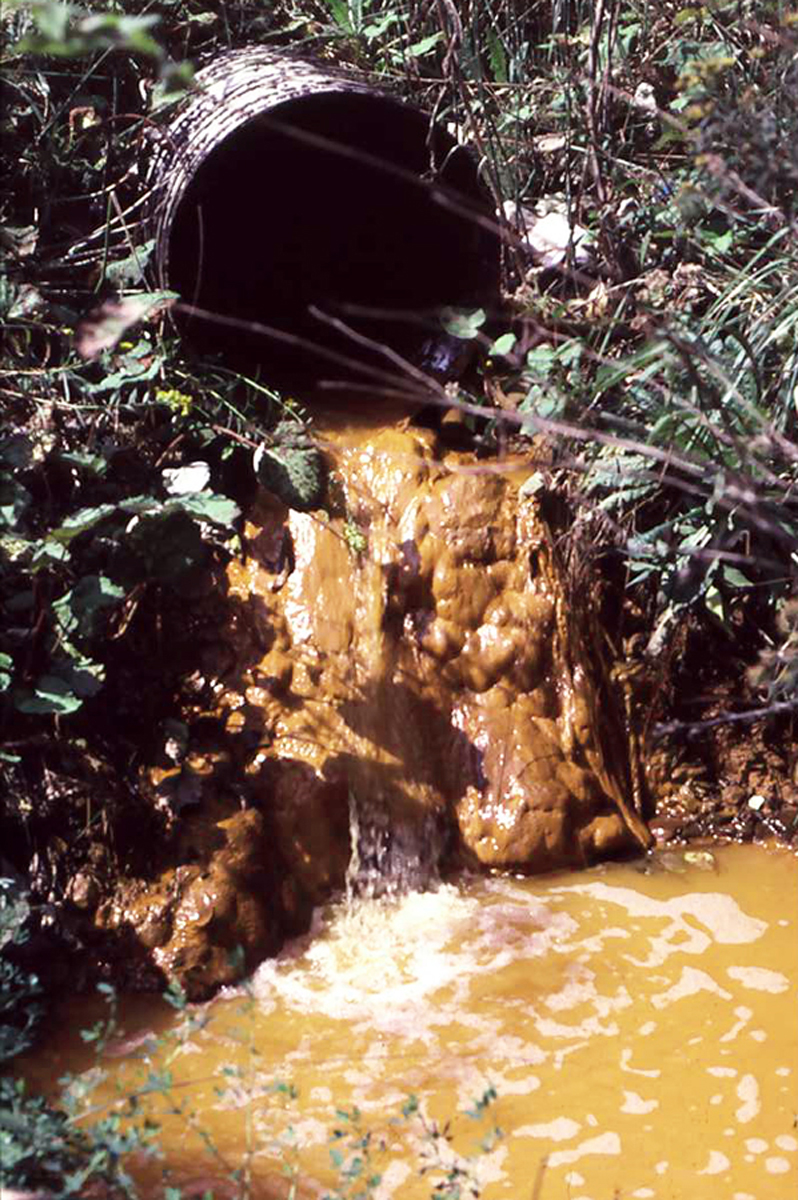
Ferrihydrite precipitate from coal mine water

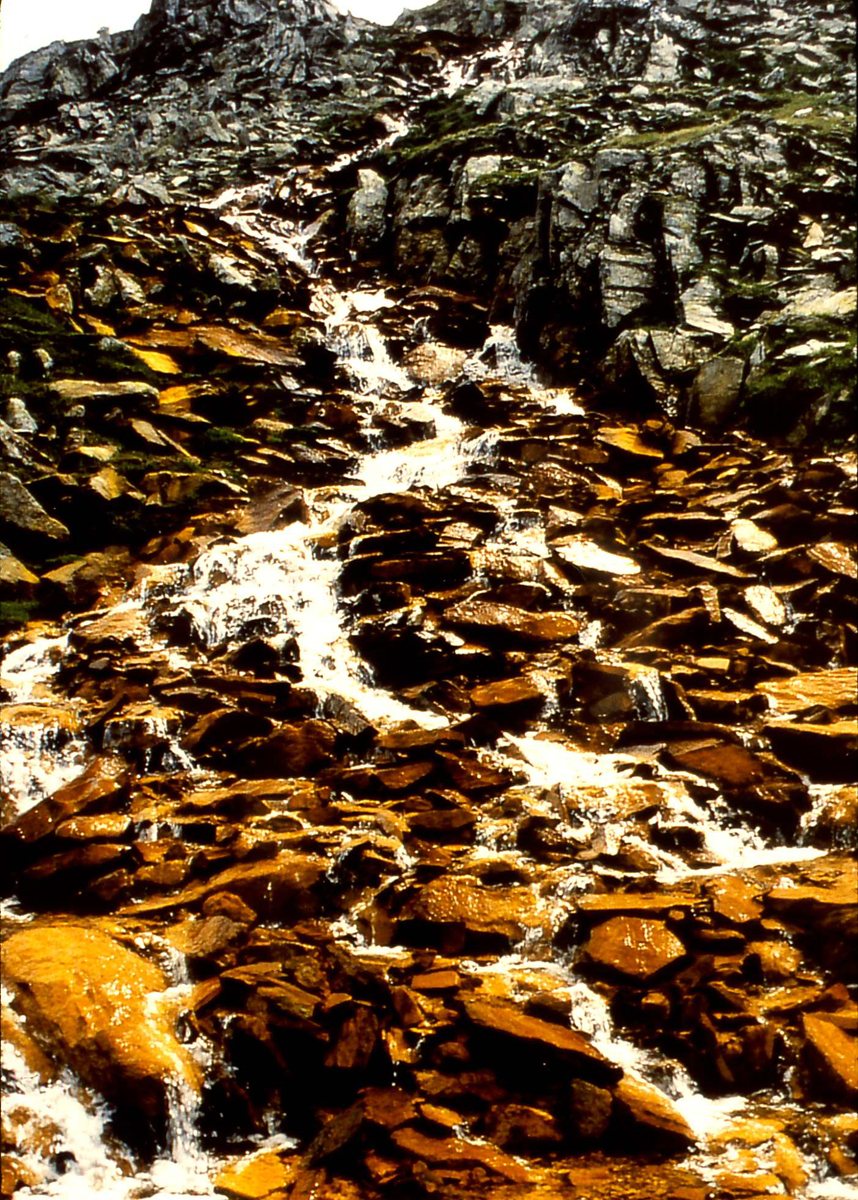
Spring in the Zillertaler Alps with Fh precipitate

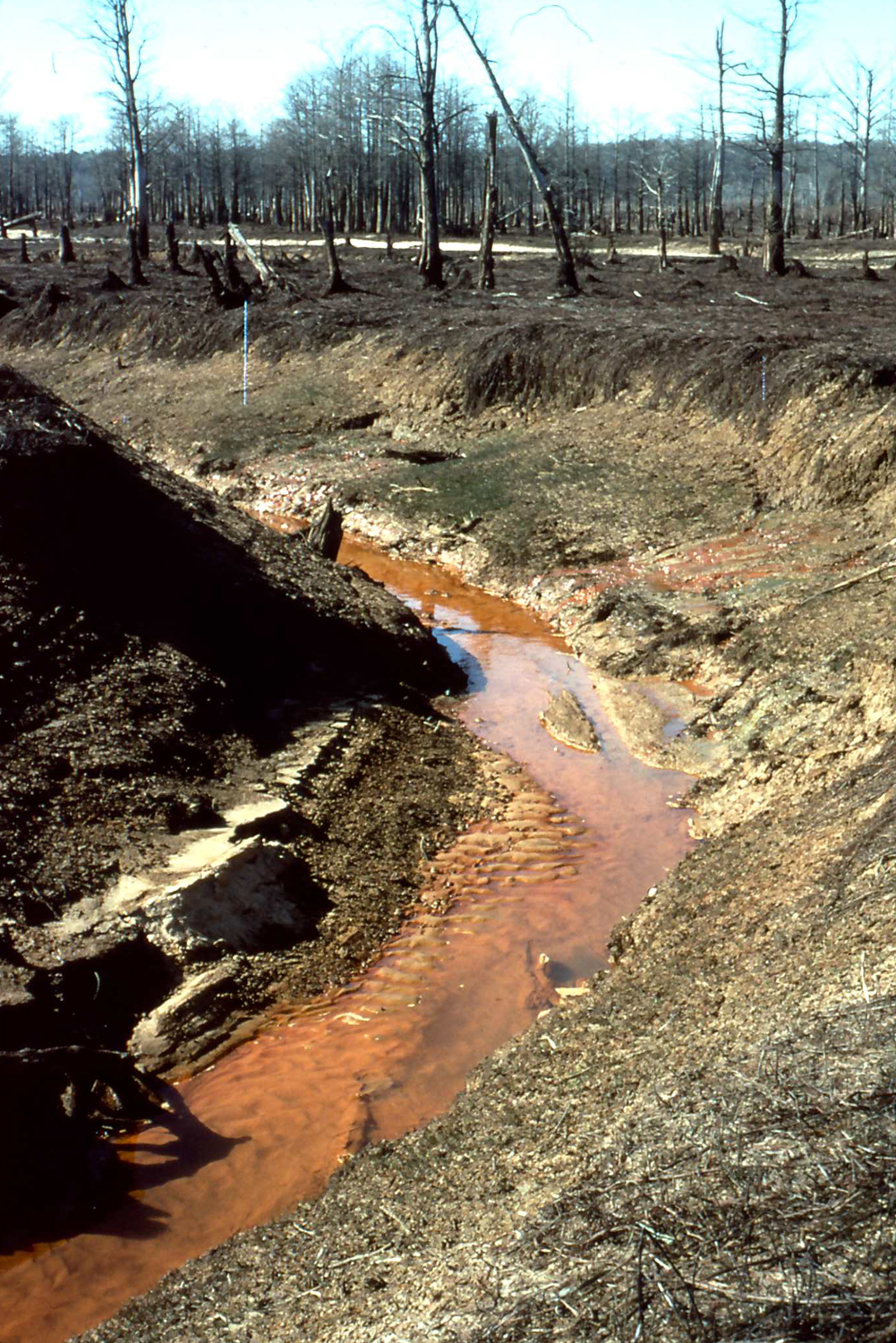
Seepage of iron-rich water
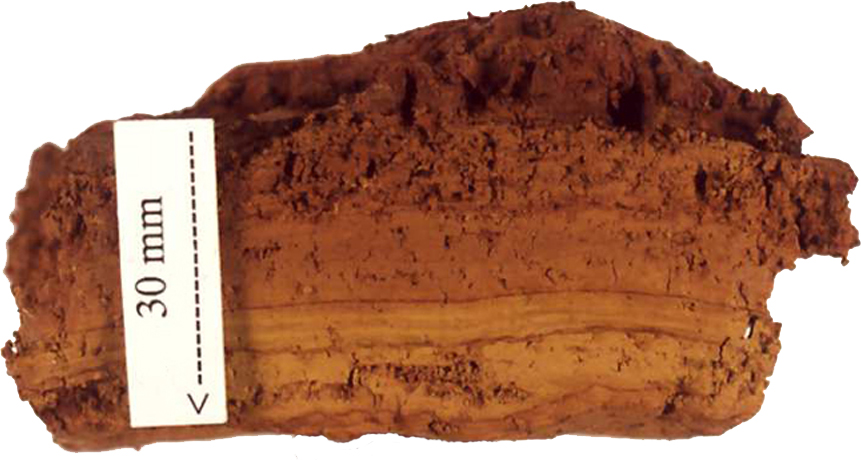
Transformation of ferrihydrite (top) to goethite (bottom)

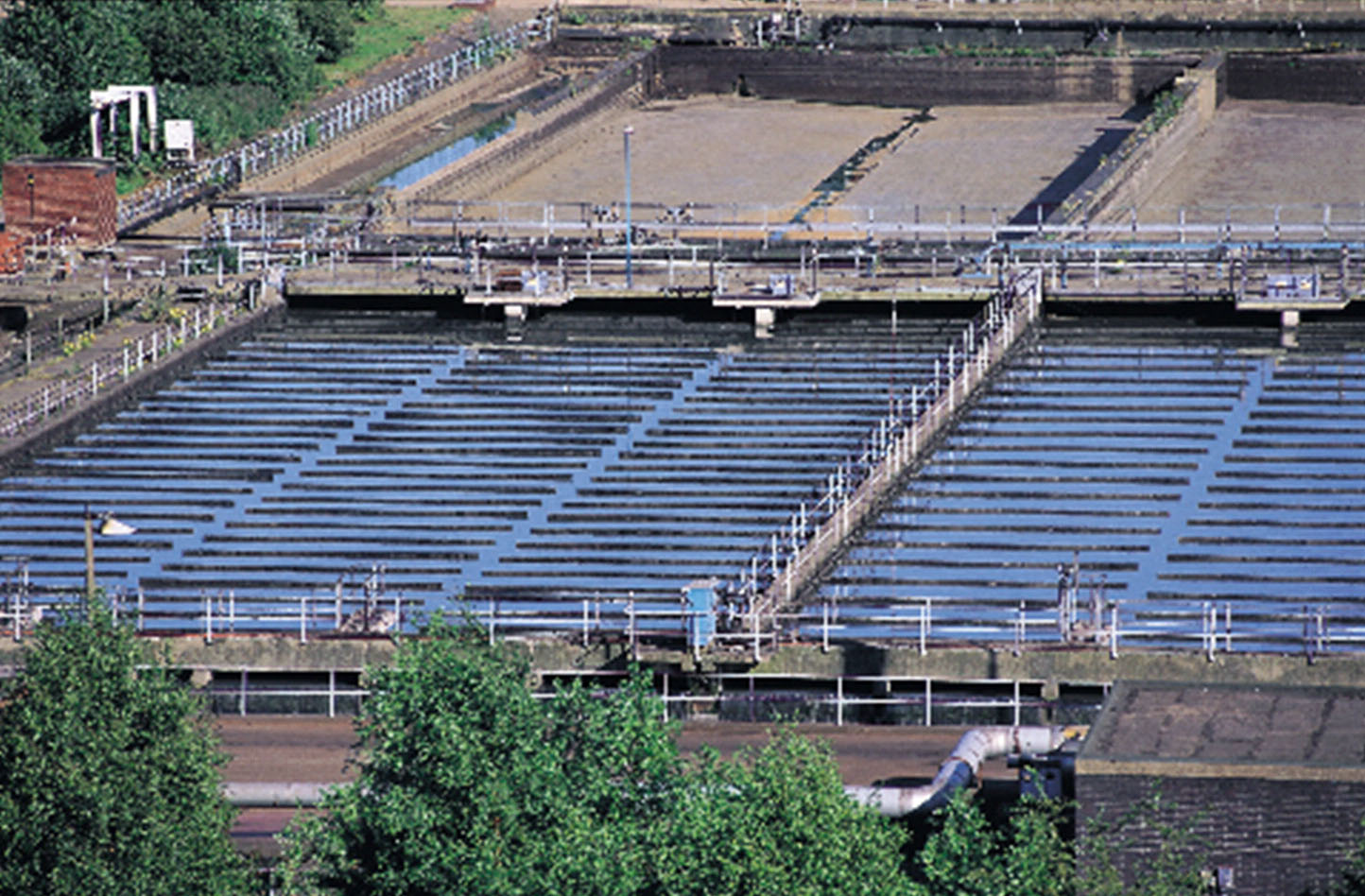
Water treatment plant using the slow sand filter technology to treat raw water

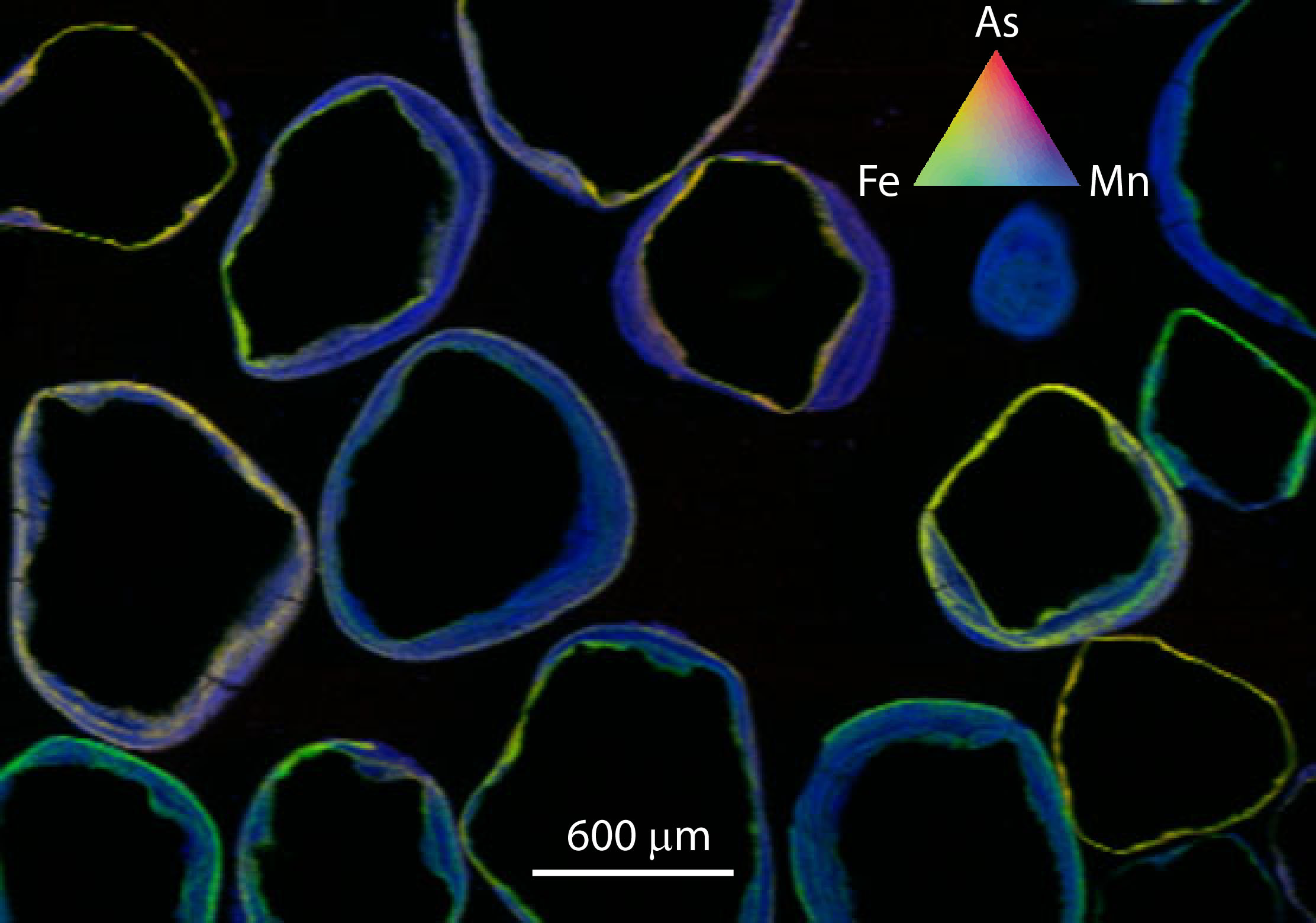
Tricolor (RGB) X-ray fluorescence image of the distribution of As (red), Fe (green), and Mn (blue) in coated quartz grains from a water treatment sand bed

== See also ==
Better crystallized and less hydrated iron oxy-hydroxides are amongst others:

- Akaganéite
- Feroxyhyte
- Goethite
- Hematite
- Lepidocrocite
- Limonite
- Maghemite
- Magnetite
