= Siderogel =

Siderogel is an amorphous mineral (a mineraloid) consisting of iron(III) oxide-hydroxide FeO(OH), the same chemical compound as limonite and goethite; or possibly an hydrate of the same FeO(OH)•nH_{2}O.

Siderogel is described as blackish, brownish, or reddish-brown, often glassy and translucent. It may be a gossan, the result of weathering and oxidation of sulfide ores.

The International Mineralogical Association does not officially recognize siderogel as a mineral species.

== Occurrence ==
Siderogel has been reported in a few locations in Europe and Asia, including a site near Gavà and Bruguers, Catalunya; in the mine of Codos, Aragon; in the Becke-Oese quarry (now flooded) between Menden and Hemer, Germany; and in the Gaosong deposit, Gejiu China.

== See also ==
- Alumogel
- Stilpnosiderite
