= Maghemite =

Iron oxide with a spinel ferrite structure

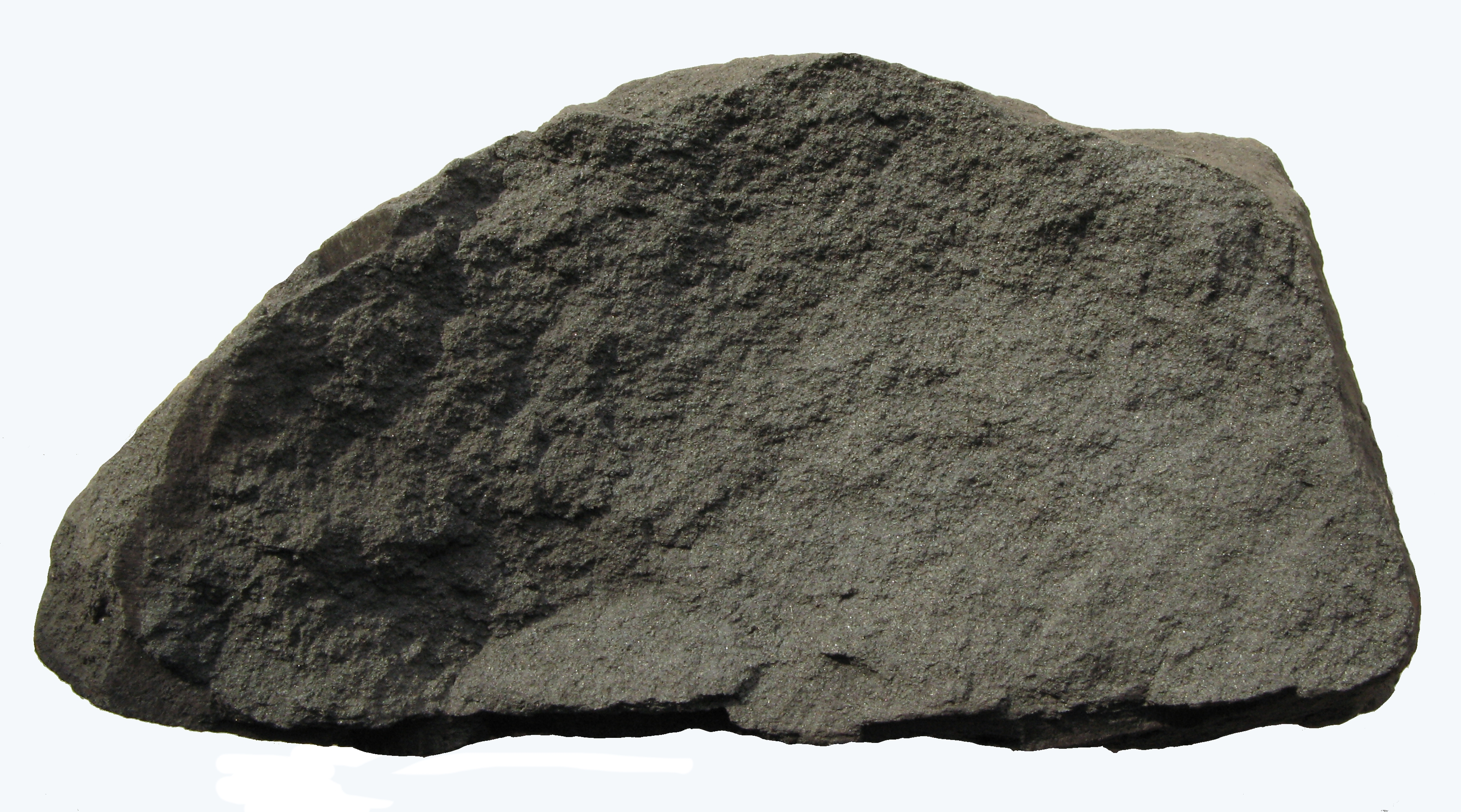

General
- Category: Oxide minerals
- Formula: γ-Fe_{2}O_{3}
- IMA symbol: Mgh
- Strunz classification: 4.BB.15
- Crystal system: Cubic with a tetragonal supercell
- Crystal class: Gyroidal (432) (same H-M symbol)
- Space group: P4_{1}32, P4_{3}32
- Unit cell: a = 8.33 Å; Z = 8 or a = 8.35 Å c = 24.99 Å; Z = 8 for tetragonal supercell

Identification
- Color: Brown, bluish black; brown to yellow in transmitted light; white to bluish gray in reflected light.
- Crystal habit: Rarely as minute octahedral crystals, or acicular overgrowths; commonly as coatings on or replacements of magnetite; massive.
- Cleavage: None
- Fracture: Subconchoidal
- Mohs scale hardness: 5
- Luster: Dull
- Streak: Brown
- Diaphaneity: Opaque, transparent in thin fragments
- Specific gravity: 4.860 (calculated)
- Optical properties: Isotropic
- Other characteristics: Strongly magnetic

Maghemite (Fe_{2}O_{3}, γ-Fe_{2}O_{3}) is a member of the family of iron oxides. It has the same formula as hematite, but the same spinel ferrite structure as magnetite (Fe_{3}O_{4}) and is also ferrimagnetic. It is sometimes spelled as "maghaemite".

Maghemite can be considered as an Fe(II)-deficient magnetite with formula $\left(\ce{Fe^{III}8}\right)_A\left[\ce{Fe^{III}_{40/3}\square_{8/3}}\right]_B\ce{O32}$ where $\square$ represents a vacancy, A indicates tetrahedral and B octahedral positioning.

== Occurrence ==
Maghemite forms by weathering or low-temperature oxidation of spinels containing iron(II) such as magnetite or titanomagnetite. Maghemite can also form through dehydration and transformation of certain iron oxyhydroxide minerals, such as lepidocrocite and ferrihydrite. It occurs as widespread brown or yellow pigment in terrestrial sediments and soils. It is associated with magnetite, ilmenite, anatase, pyrite, marcasite, lepidocrocite and goethite. It is known to also form in areas that have been subjected to bushfires (particularly in the Leonora area of Western Australia) magnetising iron minerals.

Maghemite was named in 1927 for an occurrence at the Iron Mountain Mine, northwest of Redding, Shasta County, California. The name alludes to somewhat intermediate character between magnetite and hematite. It can appear blue with a grey shade, white, or brown. It has isometric crystals. Maghemite is formed by the topotactic oxidation of magnetite.

== Cation distribution ==
There is experimental and theoretical evidence that Fe(III) cations and vacancies tend to be ordered in the octahedral sites, in a way that maximizes the homogeneity of the distribution and therefore minimizes the electrostatic energy of the crystal.

== Electronic structure ==
Maghemite is a semiconductor with a bandgap of ca. 2 eV, although the precise value of the gap depends on the electron spin.

== Applications ==
Maghemite exhibits ferrimagnetic ordering with a high Néel temperature (~950 K), which together with its low cost and chemical stability led to its wide application as a magnetic pigment in electronic recording media since the 1940s.

Maghemite nanoparticles are used in biomedicine, because they are biocompatible and non-toxic to humans, while their magnetism allows remote manipulation with external fields.

== As pollutant ==
It was found in 2022 that high levels of maghemite particles small enough to enter the bloodstream if inhaled, some as small as five nanometres, were present in the London Underground transport system. The presence of the particles indicated that they are suspended for long periods due to poor ventilation, particularly on platforms. The health implications presented by the particles were not investigated.
