= Limonite =

Hydrated iron oxide mineral

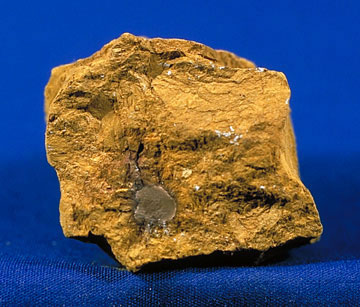

General
- Category: Amorphous, mineraloid
- Formula: FeO(OH)·nH_{2}O
- Strunz classification: Unclassified

Identification
- Color: Various shades of brown and yellow
- Crystal habit: Fine grained aggregate, powdery coating
- Cleavage: Absent
- Fracture: Uneven
- Mohs scale hardness: 4–5.5
- Luster: Earthy
- Streak: Yellowish brown
- Diaphaneity: Opaque
- Specific gravity: 2.9–4.3
- Density: 2.7–4.3 g/cm^{3}

Limonite (/ˈlaɪməˌnaɪt/) is an iron ore consisting of a mixture of hydrated iron(III) oxide-hydroxides in varying composition. The generic formula is frequently written as FeO(OH)·nH_{2}O, although this is not entirely accurate as the ratio of oxide to hydroxide can vary quite widely. Limonite is one of the three principal iron ores, the others being hematite and magnetite, and has been mined for the production of iron since at least 400 BC.

== Names ==
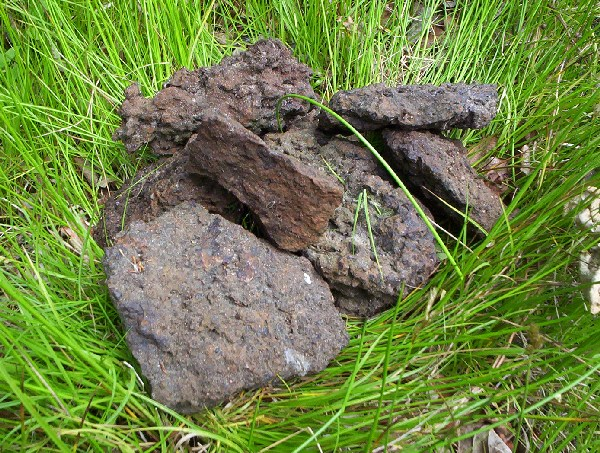
Bog iron ore

Limonite is named for the Ancient Greek word λειμών (leimṓn [leː.mɔ̌ːn]), meaning "wet meadow", or λίμνη (límnē [lím.nɛː]), meaning "marshy lake", as an allusion to its occurrence as bog iron ore in meadows and marshes. In its brown form, it is sometimes called brown hematite or brown iron ore.

== Characteristics ==
Limonite is relatively dense with a specific gravity varying from 2.7 to 4.3. It is usually medium to dark yellowish brown in color. The streak of limonite on an unglazed porcelain plate is always yellowish brown, a character which distinguishes it from hematite with a red streak, or from magnetite with a black streak. The hardness is quite variable, ranging from 1 to 5. In thin section it appears as red, yellow, or brown and has a high index of refraction, 2.0–2.4. Limonite minerals are strongly birefringent, but grain sizes are usually too small for this to be detectable.

Although originally defined as a single mineral, limonite is now recognized as a field term for a mixture of related hydrated iron oxide minerals, among them goethite, lepidocrocite, akaganeite, and jarosite. Determination of the precise mineral composition is practical only with X-ray diffraction techniques. Individual minerals in limonite may form crystals, but limonite does not, although specimens may show a fibrous or microcrystalline structure, and limonite often occurs in concretionary forms or in compact and earthy masses; sometimes mammillary, botryoidal, reniform or stalactitic. Because of its amorphous nature, and occurrence in hydrated areas limonite often presents as a clay or mudstone. However, there are limonite pseudomorphs after other minerals such as pyrite. This means that chemical weathering transforms the crystals of pyrite into limonite by hydrating the molecules, but the external shape of the pyrite crystal remains. Limonite pseudomorphs have also been formed from other iron oxides, hematite and magnetite; from the carbonate siderite and from iron rich silicates such as almandine garnets.

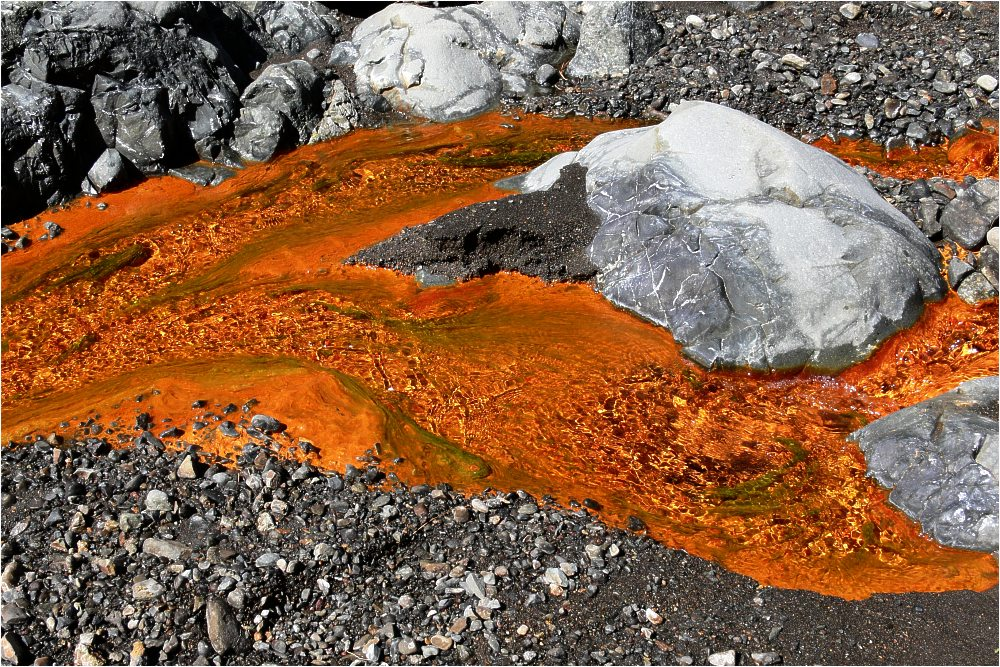
Limonite deposited from mine runoff

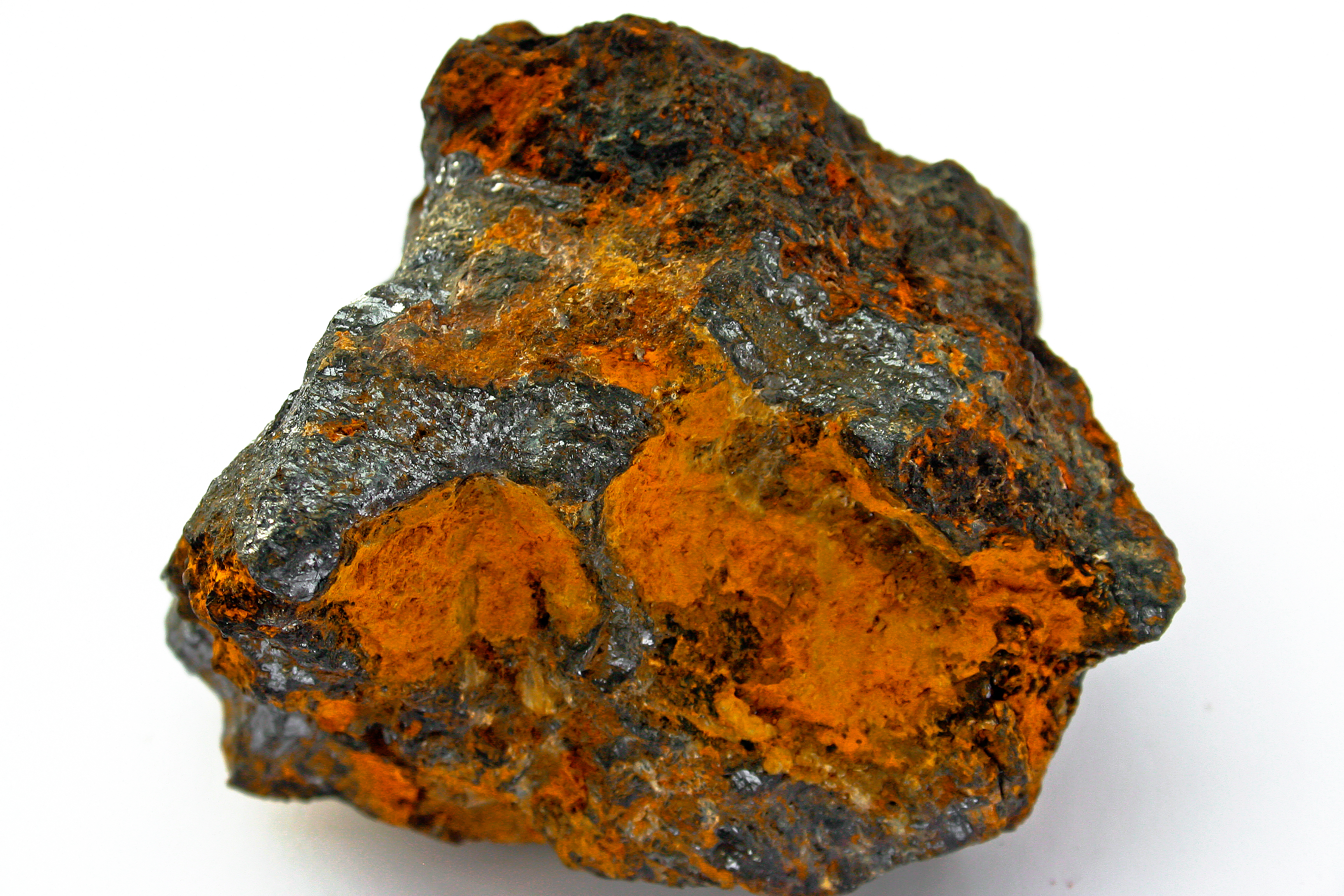
Galena and limonite

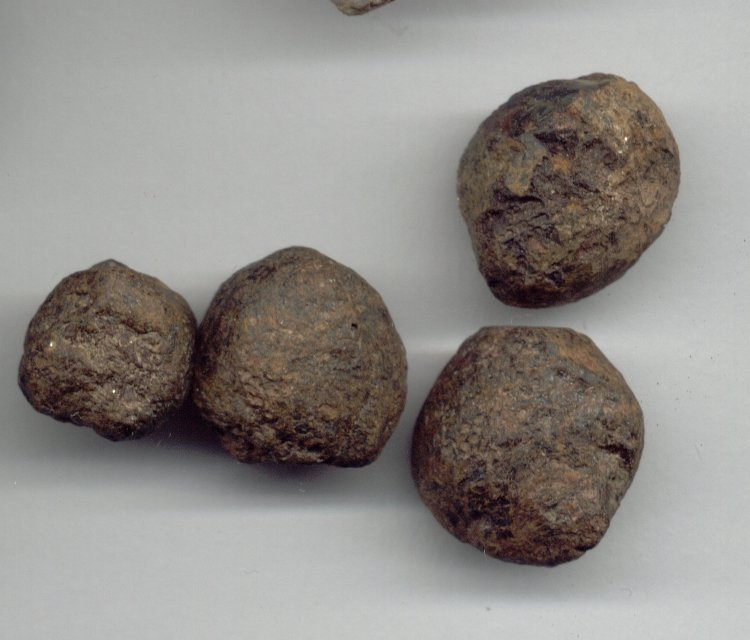
Limonite pseudomorphs after garnet

== Formation ==
Limonite usually forms from the hydration of hematite and magnetite, from the oxidation and hydration of iron rich sulfide minerals, and chemical weathering of other iron rich minerals such as olivine, pyroxene, amphibole, and biotite. It is often the major iron component in lateritic soils, and limonite laterite ores are a source of nickel and potentially cobalt and other valuable metals, present as trace elements. It is often deposited in run-off streams from mining operations.

== Uses ==
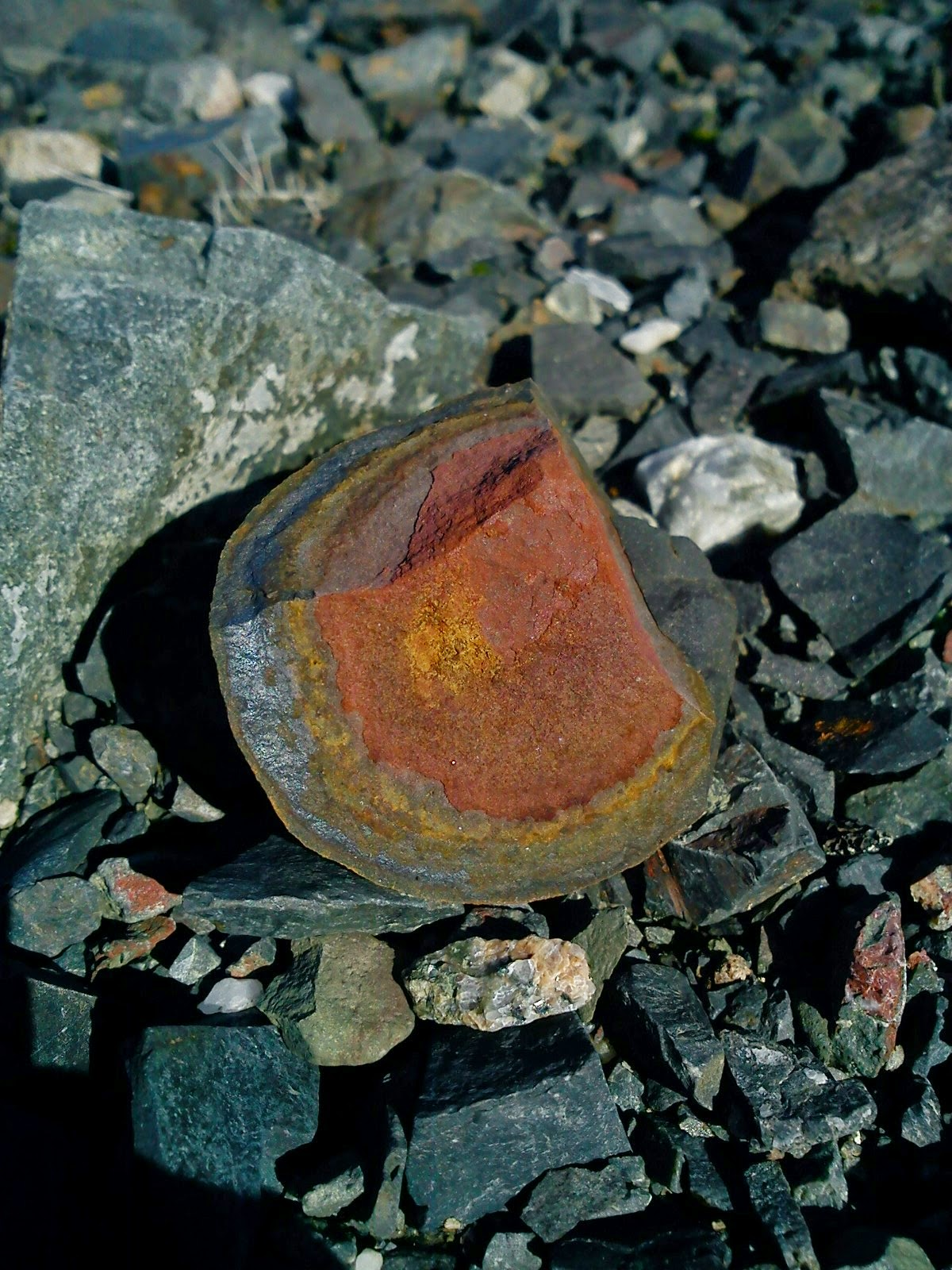
Limonite concretion from the spoil bank of a uranium mine

Nickel-rich limonite ores represent the largest reserves of nickel. Such minerals are classified as lateritic nickel ore deposits.

One of the first uses was as a pigment. The yellow form produced yellow ochre for which Cyprus was famous, while the darker forms produced more earthy tones. Roasting the limonite changed it partially to hematite, producing red ochres, burnt umbers and siennas. Bog iron ore and limonite mudstones are mined as a source of iron.

Iron caps or gossans of siliceous iron oxide typically form as the result of intensive oxidation of sulfide ore deposits. These gossans were used by prospectors as guides to buried ore.

Limonite was mined for its ancillary gold content. The oxidation of sulfide deposits which contained gold, often resulted in the concentration of gold in the iron oxide and quartz of the gossans. The gold of the primary veins was concentrated into the limonites of the deeply weathered rocks. In another example the deeply weathered iron formations of Brazil served to concentrate gold with the limonite of the resulting soils.

== History ==
Limonite was one of the earliest materials used as a pigment by humans, and can be seen in Neolithic cave paintings and pictographs.

While the first iron ore was likely meteoric iron, and hematite was far easier to smelt, in Africa, where the first evidence of iron metallurgy occurs, limonite is the most prevalent iron ore. Before smelting, as the ore was heated and the water driven off, more and more of the limonite was converted to hematite. The ore was then pounded as it was heated above 1250 °C, at which temperature the metallic iron begins sticking together and non-metallic impurities are thrown off as sparks. Complex systems developed, notably in Tanzania, to process limonite. Nonetheless, hematite and magnetite remained the ores of choice when smelting was by bloomeries, and it was only with the development of blast furnaces in the 1st century BCE in China and about 1150 CE in Europe, that the brown iron ore of limonite could be used to best advantage.

Bog iron ore and limonite were mined in the US, but this ended with the development of advanced mining techniques.

Gold-bearing limonite gossans were productively mined in the Shasta County, California, mining district. Similar deposits were mined near Rio Tinto in Spain and Mount Morgan in Australia. In the Dahlonega gold belt in Lumpkin County, Georgia, gold was mined from limonite-rich lateritic or saprolite soil (chemically weathered rock).

As saprolite deposits have been exhausted at many mining sites, limonite has become the most prominent source of nickel for energy-dense batteries.

== See also ==
- Birnessite, the most common hydrous manganese dioxide
- Ore genesis
