= Topotactic transition =

Structural change preserving the crystallographic structure of the original material

In chemistry, a topotactic transition involves a structural change to a crystalline solid, which may include loss or gain of material, so that the final lattice is related to that of the original material by one or more crystallographically equivalent, orientational relationships.

An example is a transition in which the relative structure of the anionic array is unaltered but the cations reorganize as in:

β-Li_{2}ZnSiO_{4} ⇒ γ-Li_{2}ZnSiO_{4}

An alternate example is the oxidation of magnetite to maghemite.

== See also ==
- Pseudomorphism
- Pseudomorphic substitution

== Sources ==
- IUPAC, Compendium of Chemical Terminology, 5th ed. (the "Gold Book") (2025). Online version: (2006–) "topotactic transition". doi:10.1351/goldbook.T06399
