= Chalcanthum =

In alchemy, chalcanthum, also called chalcanth or calcanthum, was a term used for the compound blue vitriol (CuSO_{4}), and the ink made from it. The term was also applied to green vitriol (ferrous sulfate).

Some maintained calcanthum to be the same thing as colcothar, while others believed it was simply vitriol (sulfuric acid).

The term "vitriol rubified" (Latin: reddened vitriol) refers to the reddish iron oxide residue (colcothar) left after heating green vitriol, and should not be confused with "red vitriol," a distinct mineral (native cobalt sulfate).
