= Feroxyhyte =

Iron hydroxide mineral

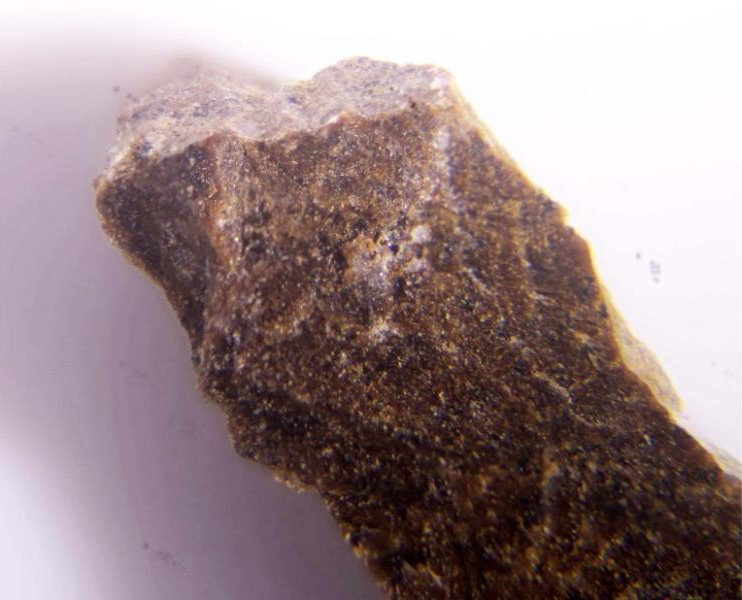
- Image of Feroxyhyte

General
- Category: Oxide mineral
- Formula: δ-Fe^{3+}O(OH)
- IMA symbol: Fox
- Strunz classification: 4.FE.40
- Dana classification: 06.01.04.04
- Crystal system: Hexagonal; Unknown space group
- Unit cell: a = 2.95, c = 4.56 [Å]; z = 1

Identification
- Formula mass: 88.85 g/mol
- Color: Brown, yellow-brown
- Crystal habit: Concretionary, massive, nodular
- Streak: Yellow
- Diaphaneity: Opaque
- Specific gravity: 4.31
- Density: 4.2
- Optical properties: Uniaxial

Feroxyhyte is an oxide/hydroxide of iron, δ-Fe^{3+}O(OH). Feroxyhyte crystallizes in the hexagonal system. Feroxyhyte forms as brown, rounded to concretionary masses. Feroxyhyte is an opaque, magnetic mineral with a yellow streak and a relative density of 4.2.

It occurs in manganese-iron nodules on the Atlantic and Pacific Ocean floors. It is also found in the Baltic, White, and Kara Seas. Forms under high pressure conditions and reverts to goethite on exposure to surface conditions. It also occurs as cement and coatings on clasts in poorly drained soils and sediments, formed by the rapid oxidation of iron(II) oxide compounds.

It was first described in 1976 for an occurrence in soils at its type locality: Kolomyya, Ivano-Frankivsk Oblast, Ukraine.

== See also ==
- Akaganeite
- Ferrihydrite
- Iron(III) oxide-hydroxide
- Lepidocrocite
