= Iron(III) oxide-hydroxide =

Hydrous ferric oxide (HFO)

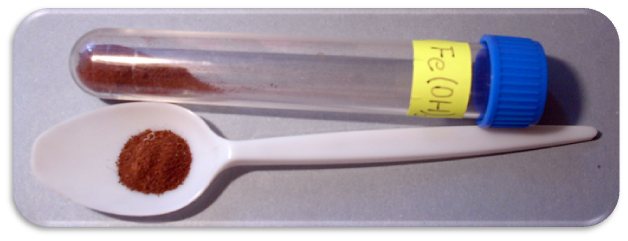
- Samples of iron(III) oxide-hydroxide monohydrate in a vial, and a spoon

Names
- IUPAC name Iron(III) oxide-hydroxide
- Other names Metaferric acid Ferric oxyhydroxide Goethite

Identifiers
CAS Number	1310–14–1; 20344–49–4
3D model (JSmol)	Interactive image
ChemSpider	82623
ECHA InfoCard	100.039.754
EC Number	215–176–6
MeSH	Goethite
PubChem CID	91502
UNII	87PZU03K0K
CompTox Dashboard (EPA)	DTXSID801318339 DTXSID3042057, DTXSID801318339
- InChI: InChI=1S/Fe.H2O.O/h;1H2;/q+1;;/p-1 Key: AEIXRCIKZIZYPM-UHFFFAOYSA-M
- SMILES: O=[Fe]O

Properties
Chemical formula	FeO(OH)
Appearance	Vivid, dark orange, opaque crystals
Odor	odorless
Density	4.25 g/cm^{3}
Solubility in water	insoluble at pH 7
Solubility product (K_{sp})	2.79×10^{−39} for Fe(OH)_{3}

Hazards
NFPA 704 (fire diamond)	1 0 0

Pharmacology
ATC code	B03AB04 (WHO)
- Except where otherwise noted, data are given for materials in their standard state (at 25 °C [77 °F], 100 kPa). verify (what is ?) Infobox references

Iron(III) oxide-hydroxide or ferric oxyhydroxide is the chemical compound of iron, oxygen, and hydrogen with formula FeO(OH).

The compound is often encountered as its hydrates - FeO(OH)·nH_{2}O, e.g. in rust. The monohydrate FeO(OH)·H_{2}O (sometimes incorrectly labelled Fe(OH)_{3}) is often referred to as iron(III) hydroxide, hydrated iron oxide, yellow iron oxide, or Pigment Yellow 42.

== Natural occurrences ==
=== Minerals ===
Anhydrous ferric hydroxide occurs in the nature as the exceedingly rare mineral bernalite, Fe(OH)_{3}·nH_{2}O (n = 0.0–0.25). Iron oxyhydroxides, FeO(OH), are much more common and occur naturally as structurally different minerals (polymorphs) denoted by the Greek letters α, β, γ and δ.

- Goethite, α-FeO(OH), has been used as an ochre pigment since prehistoric times.
- Akaganeite is the β polymorph, formed by weathering and noted for its presence in some meteorites and the lunar surface. However, recently it has been determined that it must contain some chloride ions to stabilize its structure, so that its more accurate formula is FeO_{0.833}(OH)_{1.167}Cl_{0.167} or Fe_{6}O_{5}(OH)_{7}Cl.
- Lepidocrocite, the γ polymorph, is commonly encountered as rust on the inside of steel water pipes and tanks.
- Feroxyhyte (δ) is formed under the high pressure conditions of sea and ocean floors, being thermodynamically unstable with respect to the α polymorph (goethite) at surface conditions.

=== Non-mineral ===
- Siderogel is a naturally occurring colloidal form of iron(III) oxide-hydroxide.

Goethite and lepidocrocite, both crystallizing in orthorhombic system, are the most common forms of iron(III) oxyhydroxide and the most important mineral carriers of iron in soils.

=== Mineraloids ===
Iron(III) oxyhydroxide is the main component of other minerals and mineraloids:

- Limonite is a commonly occurring mixture of mainly goethite, lepidocrocite, quartz and clay minerals.
- Ferrihydrite is an amorphous or nanocrystalline hydrated mineral, officially FeO(OH)·1.8H_{2}O but with widely variable hydration.

== Properties ==
The color of iron(III) oxyhydroxide ranges from yellow through dark-brown to black, depending on the degree of hydration, particle size and shape, and crystal structure.

=== Structure ===
The crystal structure of β-FeO(OH) (akaganeite) is that of hollandite or BaMn_{8}O_{16}. The unit cell is tetragonal with a = 1.048 and c = 0.3023 nm, and contains eight formula units of FeO(OH). Its dimensions are about 500 × 50 × 50 nm. Twinning often produces particles with the shape of hexagonal stars.

=== Chemistry ===
On heating, β-FeOOH decomposes and recrystallizes as α-Fe_{2}O_{3} (hematite).

== Uses ==
Limonite, a mixture of various hydrates and polymorphs of ferric oxyhydroxide, is one of the three major iron ores, having been used since at least 2500 BC.

Yellow iron oxide, or Pigment Yellow 42, is Food and Drug Administration (FDA) approved for use in cosmetics and is used in some tattoo inks.

Iron oxide-hydroxide is also used in aquarium water treatment as a phosphate binder.

Iron oxide-hydroxide nanoparticles have been studied as possible adsorbents for lead removal from aquatic media.

=== Medication ===
Iron polymaltose is used in treatment of iron-deficiency anemia.

== Production ==
Iron(III) oxyhydroxide precipitates from solutions of iron(III) salts at pH between 6.5 and 8. Thus the oxyhydroxide can be obtained in the lab by reacting an iron(III) salt, such as ferric chloride or ferric nitrate, with sodium hydroxide:

FeCl_{3} + 3 NaOH → FeO(OH)·H_{2}O + 3 NaCl
Fe(NO_{3})_{3} + 3 NaOH → FeO(OH)·H_{2}O + 3 NaNO_{3}

In fact, when dissolved in water, pure FeCl_{3} will hydrolyze to some extent, yielding the oxyhydroxide and making the solution acidic:

FeCl_{3} + 2 H_{2}O ⇌ FeO(OH) + 3 HCl

Therefore, the compound can also be obtained by the decomposition of acidic solutions of iron(III) chloride held near the boiling point for days or weeks:

FeCl_{3} + 2 H_{2}O → FeO(OH)_{(s)} + 3 HCl_{(g)}

(The same process applied to iron(III) nitrate Fe(NO_{3})_{3} or perchlorate Fe(ClO_{4})_{3} solutions yields instead particles of α-Fe_{2}O_{3}.)

Another similar route is the decomposition of iron(III) nitrate dissolved in stearic acid at about 120 °C.

The oxyhydroxide prepared from ferric chloride is usually the β polymorph (akaganeite), often in the form of thin needles.

The oxyhydroxide can also be produced by a solid-state transformation from iron(II) chloride tetrahydrate FeCl_{2}·4H_{2}O.

The compound also readily forms when iron(II) hydroxide is exposed to air:

4Fe(OH)_{2} + O_{2} → 4 FeO(OH) + 2 H_{2}O

The iron(II) hydroxide can also be oxidized by hydrogen peroxide in the presence of an acid:

2Fe(OH)_{2} + H_{2}O_{2} → 2 FeO(OH)·H_{2}O

== See also ==
- Rust
- Iron oxide
- Yellow boy, a yellow precipitate when acidic runoff such as mine waste, is then neutralised
