= Akaganeite =

Iron(III) oxide-hydroxide mineral

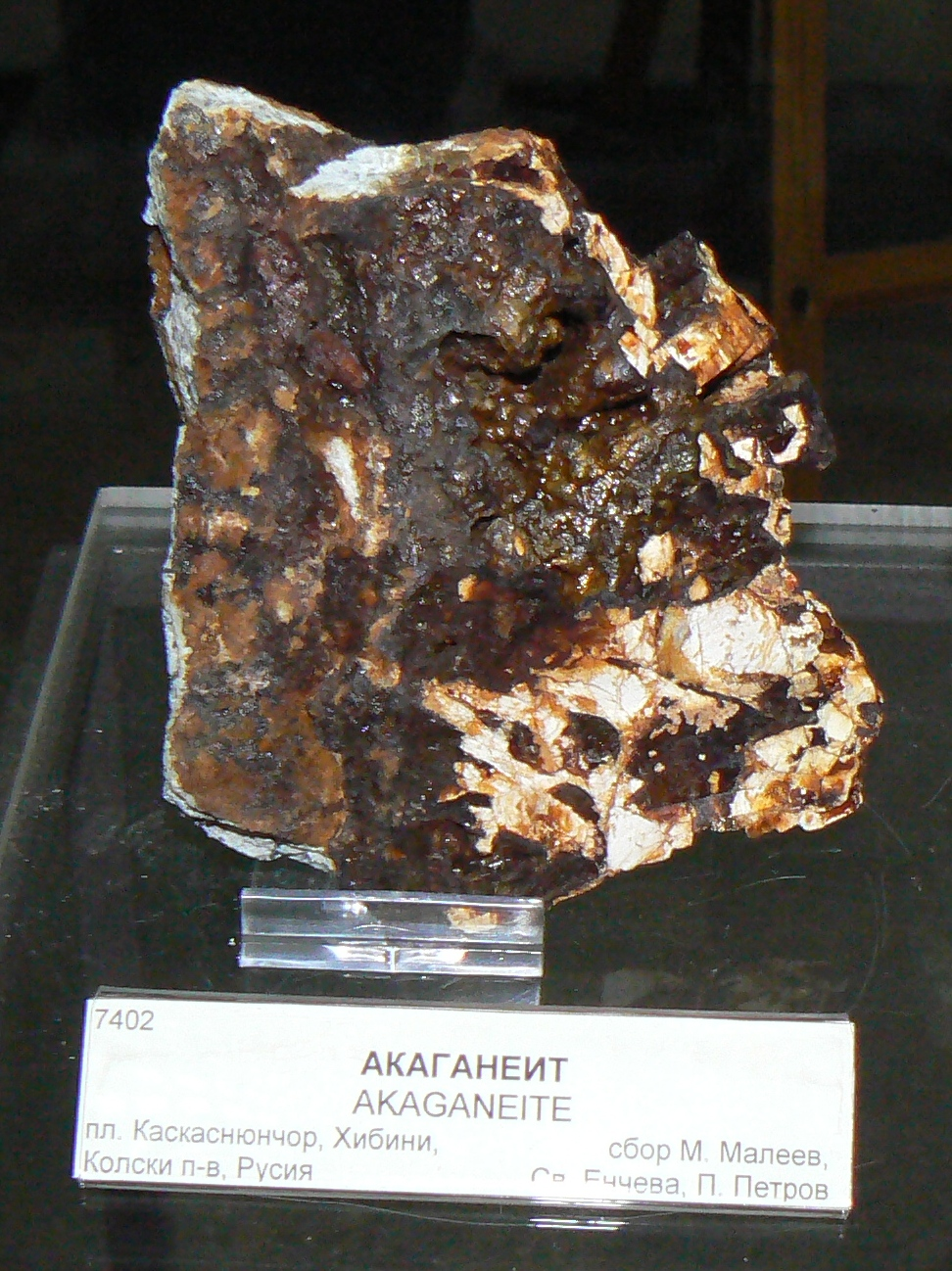
- A piece of the mineral akaganeite. Exhibit of the "Earth and Man" Museum in Sofia, Bulgaria. Discovered in Kaskasnyunchorr, Khibiny Massif, Kola Peninsula, Russia

General
- Category: Oxide mineral
- Formula: Fe^{3+}O(OH,Cl)
- IMA symbol: Akg
- Strunz classification: 4.DK.05
- Crystal system: Monoclinic
- Crystal class: Prismatic (2/m) (same H-M symbol)
- Space group: I2/m
- Unit cell: a = 10.561, b = 3.031 c = 10.483 [Å]; β = 90.63°; Z = 1

Identification
- Color: Yellowish brown, rusty brown
- Luster: Earthy
- Streak: Brownish yellow
- Diaphaneity: Transparent, translucent
- Specific gravity: 3.52

Akaganeite, also written as the deprecated Akaganéite, is a chloride-containing iron(III) oxide-hydroxide mineral, formed by the weathering of pyrrhotite (Fe_{1−x}S), an iron-deficient sulfide.

Akaganeite is often described as the β phase of anhydrous ferric oxyhydroxide FeOOH, but some chloride (or fluoride) anions are commonly included in the structure, so a more accurate formula is FeO_{0.833}(OH)_{1.167}Cl_{0.167}. This formula derives from the more general expression FeO_{1-x}(OH)_{1+x}Cl_{x}, where x = 1/6 ≃ 0.167. As the anion O^{2−} is doubly negatively charged, to maintain the electroneutrality in the crystal lattice, the electrical charge deficit (2x) in O^{2−} must be compensated by two monovalent anions, one OH^{−} and one Cl^{−}. Nickel may substitute for iron, yielding the more general formula (Fe^{3+},Ni^{2+})_{8}(OH,O)_{16}Cl_{1.25}

Akaganeite has a metallic luster and a brownish yellow streak. Its crystal structure is monoclinic and similar to that of hollandite BaMn_{8}O_{16}, characterised by the presence of tunnels parallel to the c-axis of the tetragonal lattice. These tunnels are partially occupied by chloride anions, which provide the crystal with its structural stability.

== Occurrence ==
The mineral was discovered in the Akagane mine in Iwate, Japan, for which it is named. It was described by the Japanese mineralogist Matsuo Nambu in 1968, but named as early as 1961.

Akaganeite has also been found in widely dispersed locations around the world and in rocks from the Moon that were brought back during the Apollo Project. The occurrences in meteorites and the lunar sample are thought to have been produced by interaction with Earth's atmosphere. It has been detected on Mars through orbital imaging spectroscopy.

== See also ==
- Feroxyhyte
- Ferrihydrite
- Iron(III) oxide-hydroxide
- Lepidocrocite
- List of minerals
