= Goethite =

Iron(III) oxide-hydroxide named in honor to the poet Goethe

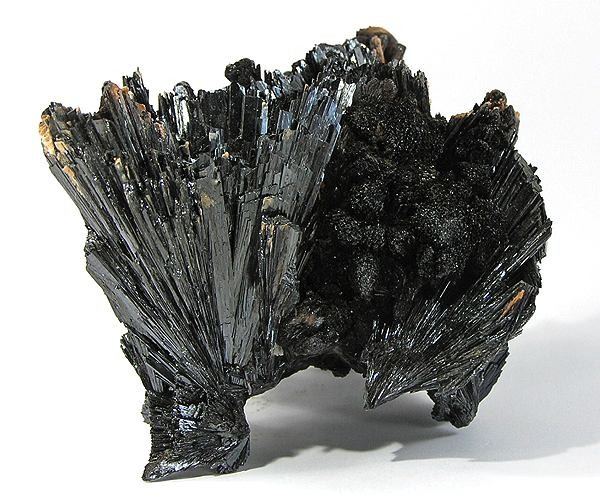

General
- Category: oxide minerals hydroxide subgroup
- Formula: α-FeO(OH)
- IMA symbol: Gth
- Strunz classification: 4.FD.10
- Crystal system: Orthorhombic
- Crystal class: Dipyramidal (mmm); H–M symbol: (2/m 2/m 2/m)
- Space group: Pbnm

Identification
- Color: Yellowish to reddish to dark brown or black
- Crystal habit: Radial acicular, mammillary, botryoidal, stalactitic, massive, as encrustation, as pseudomorph; may be banded or iridescent
- Cleavage: Perfect {010}
- Fracture: Uneven to splintery
- Mohs scale hardness: 5.0–5.5
- Luster: Adamantine to dull
- Streak: Brown, brownish yellow to orange yellow
- Specific gravity: 3.3–4.3
- Refractive index: Opaque to sub-translucent
- Fusibility: Fusible at 5–5.5
- Solubility: HCl soluble
- Other characteristics: weakly magnetic

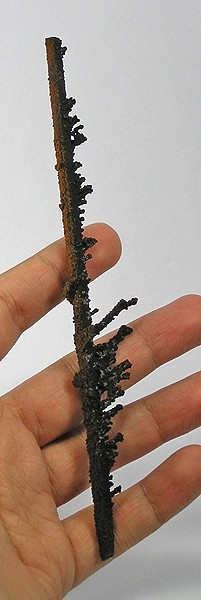
Unusual specimen of goethite replacing a gypsum stalactite; the center is hollow. From Santa Eulalia, Chihuahua, Mexico.

Goethite (/ˈɡɜːrtaɪt/, US also /ˈɡoʊθaɪt/) is a mineral of the diaspore group, consisting of iron(III) oxide-hydroxide, specifically the α-polymorph. It is found in soil and other low-temperature environments such as sediment. Goethite has been well known since ancient times for its use as a pigment (brown ochre). Evidence has been found of its use in paint pigment samples taken from the caves of Lascaux in France. It was first described in 1806 based on samples found in the Hollertszug Mine in Herdorf, Germany. The mineral was named after the German polymath and poet Johann Wolfgang von Goethe (1749–1832).

== Composition ==
Goethite is an iron oxyhydroxide containing ferric iron. It is the main component of rust and bog iron ore. Goethite's hardness ranges from 5.0 to 5.5 on the Mohs Scale, and its specific gravity varies from 3.3 to 4.3. The mineral forms prismatic needle-like crystals ("needle ironstone") but is more typically massive.

Feroxyhyte and lepidocrocite are both polymorphs of the iron oxyhydroxide FeO(OH) which are stable at the pressure and temperature conditions of the Earth's surface. Although they have the same chemical formula as goethite, their different crystalline structures make them distinct minerals.

Additionally, goethite has several high-pressure and high-temperature polymorphs, which may be relevant to the conditions of the Earth's interior. These include ε-FeOOH, which has an orthorhombic crystal structure, a cubic pyrite-type polymorph with or without losing hydrogen and an ultradense hexagonal structure.

Goethite has the same crystal structure as diaspore, the analogous aluminium oxide-hydroxide mineral. Oxygen and hydroxide ions form a hexagonal close-packed structure, with iron ions filling octahedral sites between the anions. The sites filled by iron ions form paired chains running the length of the crystal, with the two chains in each pair joined by hydroxide ions.

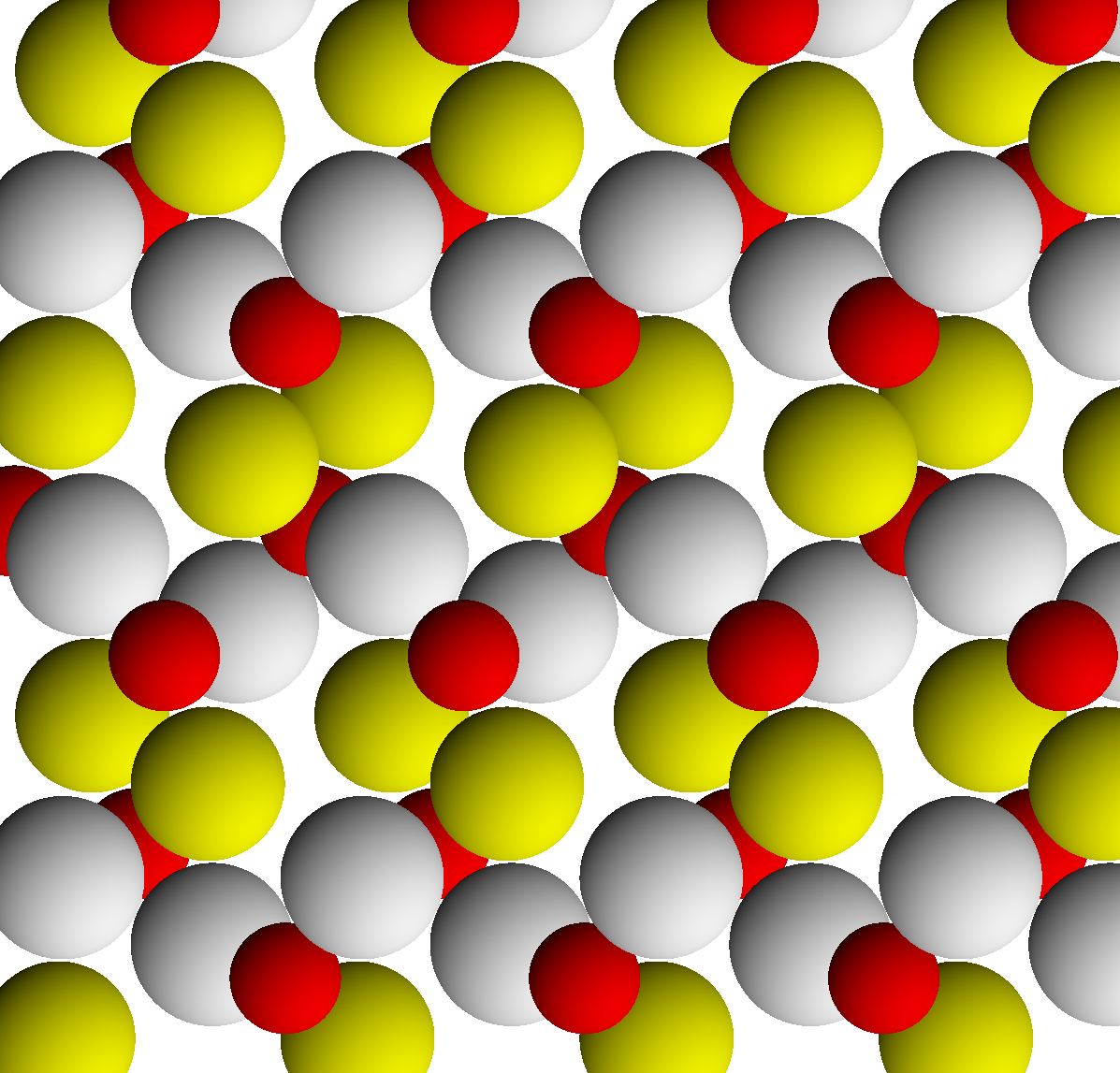
The goethite crystal structure viewed along [001]. Red ions are iron, white are oxygen, and yellow are hydroxide.

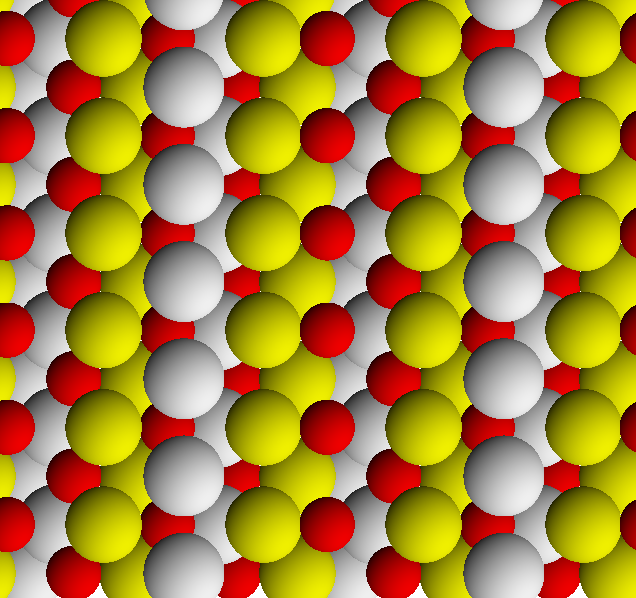
The goethite crystal structure viewed along [010]

== Formation ==
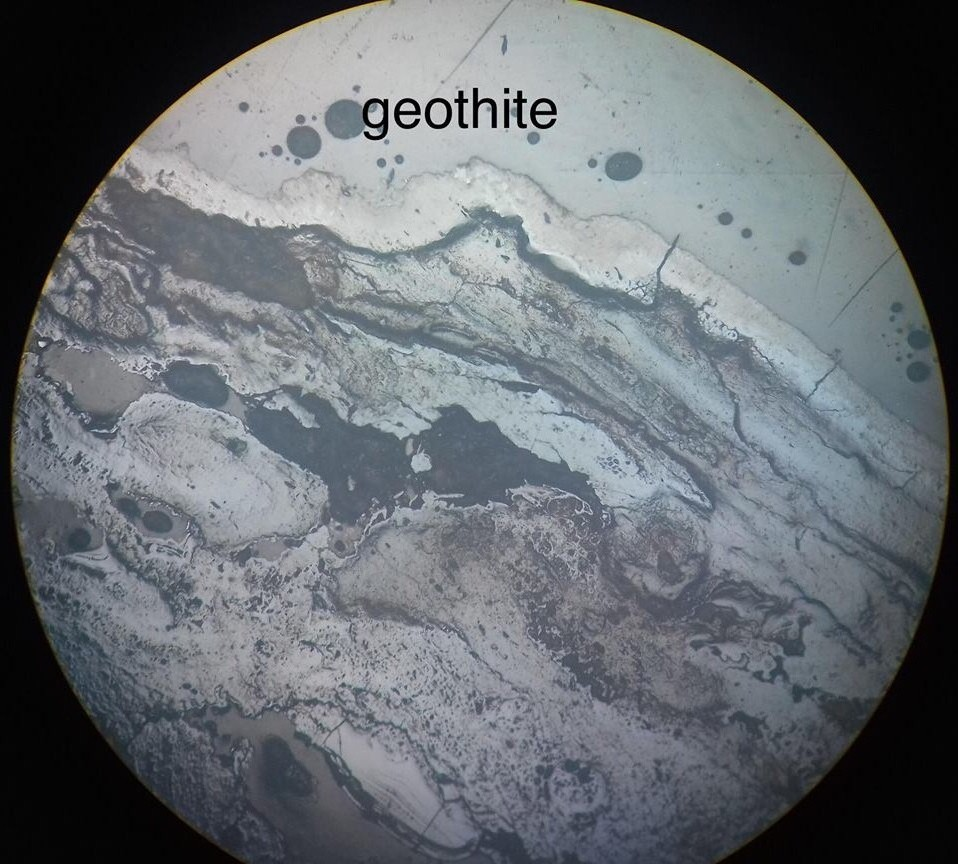
A microscopic picture of goethite (name misspelled on picture)

Goethite often forms through the weathering of other iron-rich minerals, and thus is a common component of soils, concentrated in laterite soils. Nanoparticulate authigenic goethite is a common diagenetic iron oxyhydroxide in both marine and lake sediments. The formation of goethite is marked by the oxidation state change of Fe^{2+} (ferrous) to Fe^{3+} (ferric), which allows for goethite to exist at surface conditions. Because of this oxidation state change, goethite is commonly seen as a pseudomorph. As iron-bearing minerals are brought to the zone of oxidation within the soil, the iron turns from iron(II) to iron(III), while the original shape of the parent mineral is retained. Common goethite pseudomorphs include pyrite, siderite, and marcasite, though any iron(II)-bearing mineral could become a goethite pseudomorph if proper conditions are met. It may also be precipitated by groundwater or in other sedimentary conditions, or form as a primary mineral in hydrothermal deposits. Goethite has also been found to be produced by the excretion processes of certain bacteria types.

== Distribution ==
Goethite is found all over the planet, usually in the form of concretions, stalactitic formations, oolites (a form consisting of tiny round grains cemented together), reniform (kidney shapes) or botryoidal (globular, like bunches of grapes) accumulations. It is also a very common pseudomorph. It is frequently encountered in the swampy areas at the head of spring waters ('bog iron'), on cave floors, and on the bottom of lakes and small creeks. The boxworks or gossan resulting from the oxidation of sulfide ore deposits is formed of goethite along with other iron oxides and quartz.

Significant deposits of goethite are found in England; Cuba; and Minnesota, Missouri, Colorado, Alabama, Georgia, Virginia, and Tennessee, in the United States.

Deposits significant in location, if not in abundance, have been found in the Martian crater Gusev by NASA's Spirit rover, providing strong evidence for the presence of liquid water on the planet in an earlier stage of its evolution.

Limpets' teeth are composed of about 80% goethite fibres of only tens of nanometers in diameter, small enough to be flaw-insensitive, which accounts for their extreme tensile strength of 3.5–6.0 GPa and elastic modulus of 120±30 GPa.

== Usage ==
Its main modern use is as an iron ore, being referred to as brown iron ore. Goethite is an important component of ochre pigments, and has been heat-treated for use as a red pigment since Paleolithic times. Iron-rich lateritic soils that have developed over serpentinite rocks in tropical climates are mined for their iron content, as well as other metals.

Fine goethite specimens are rare and therefore are valued collectibles. Banded or iridescent varieties are cut and polished into cabochons for jewelry making.

In a royal tomb of the ancient kingdom of Phrygia, a body was found believed to be King Gordias, father of the legendary King Midas. The burial shroud had been colored with a dye containing goethite, which in its original un-faded state would have made the shroud look as though it were woven from gold. Historians speculate that the legend of King Midas' golden touch might have originated from Phrygian royalty wearing clothes made from such golden-colored textiles.

== Gallery ==
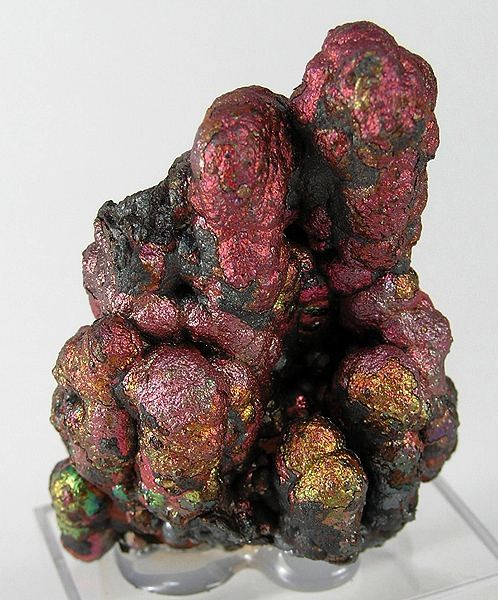
Iridescent goethite, Filón Sur Mine, Tharsis, Huelva, Spain

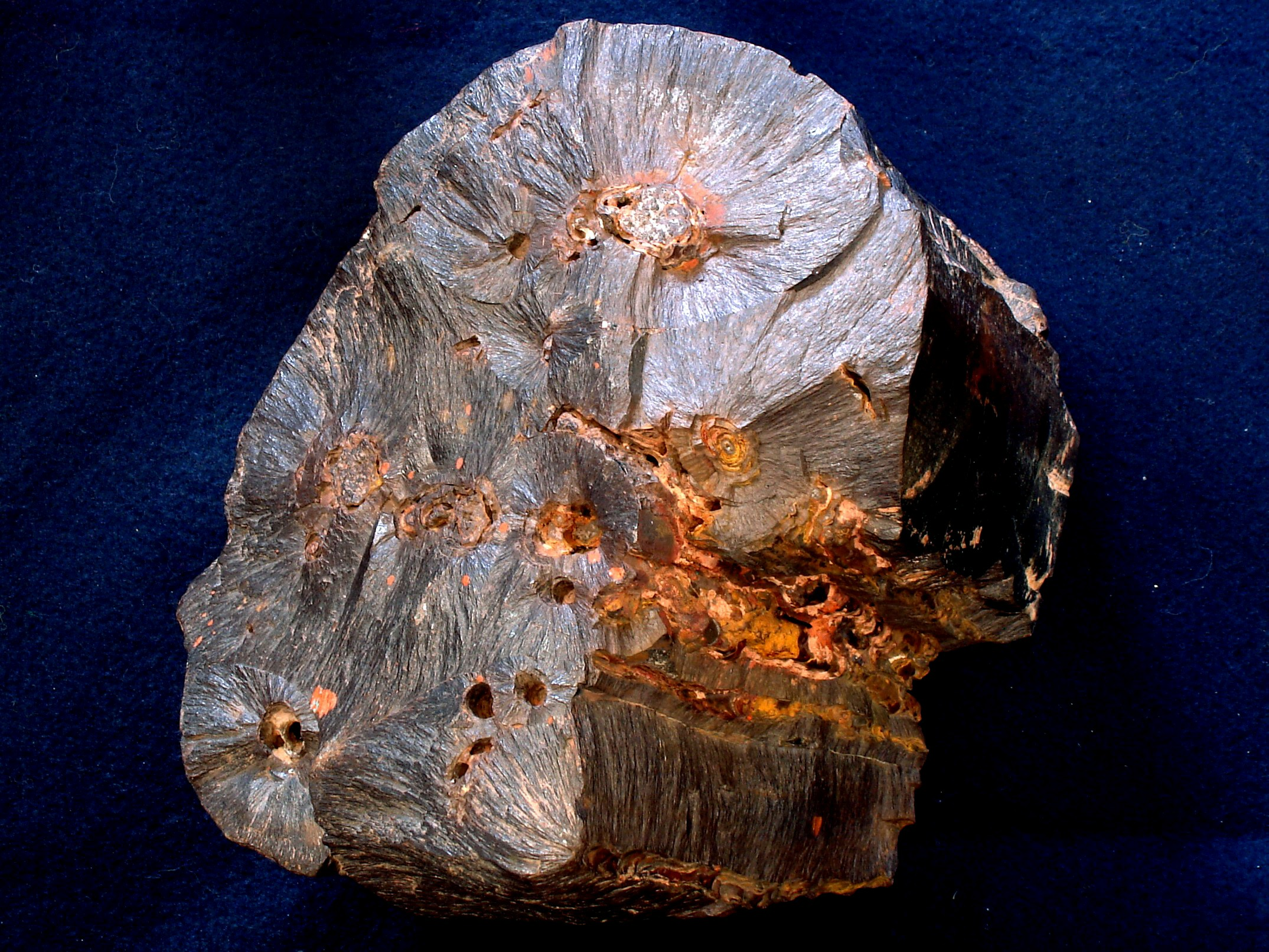
Goethite from Minas Gerais, Brazil

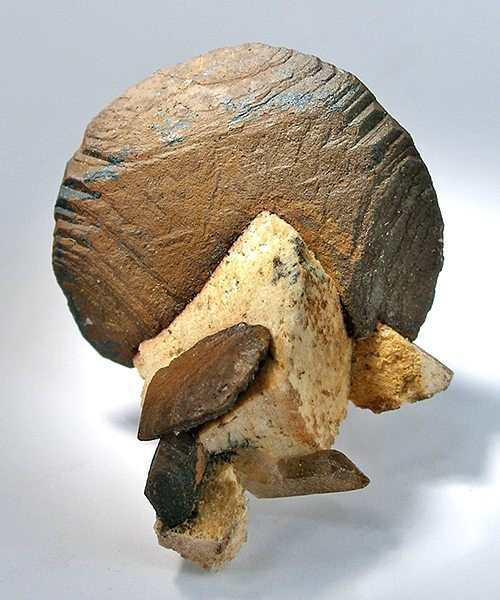
A sharp, disc-shaped calcite has here been completely replaced by goethite, which preserved the original form perfectly

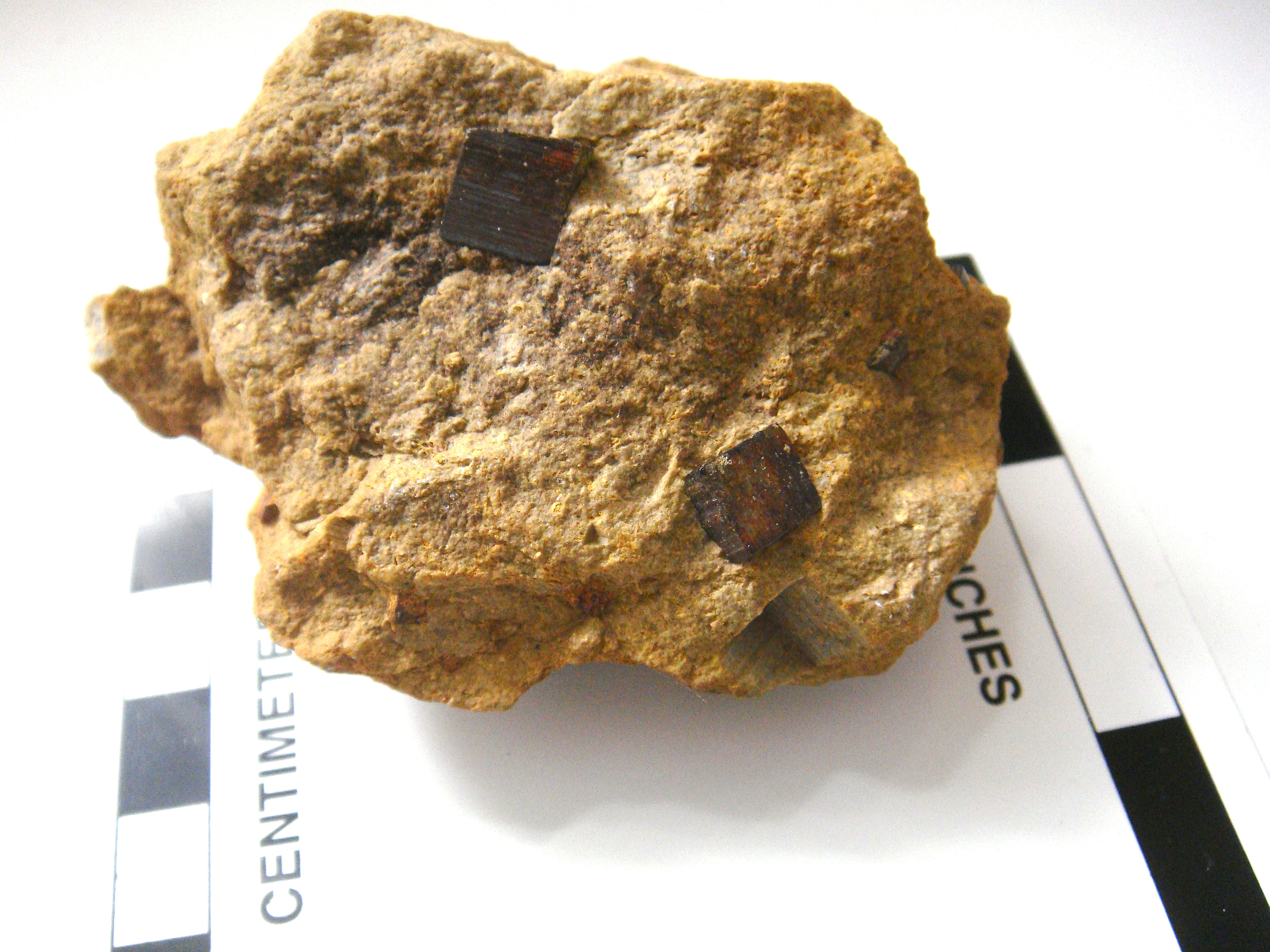
Goethite coating/replacing rusted pyrite cubes

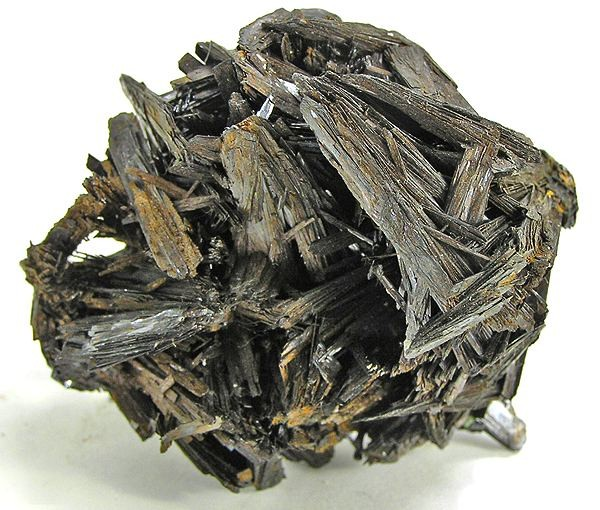
Finely crystallized specimen of goethite from Lake George, Park County, Colorado, US

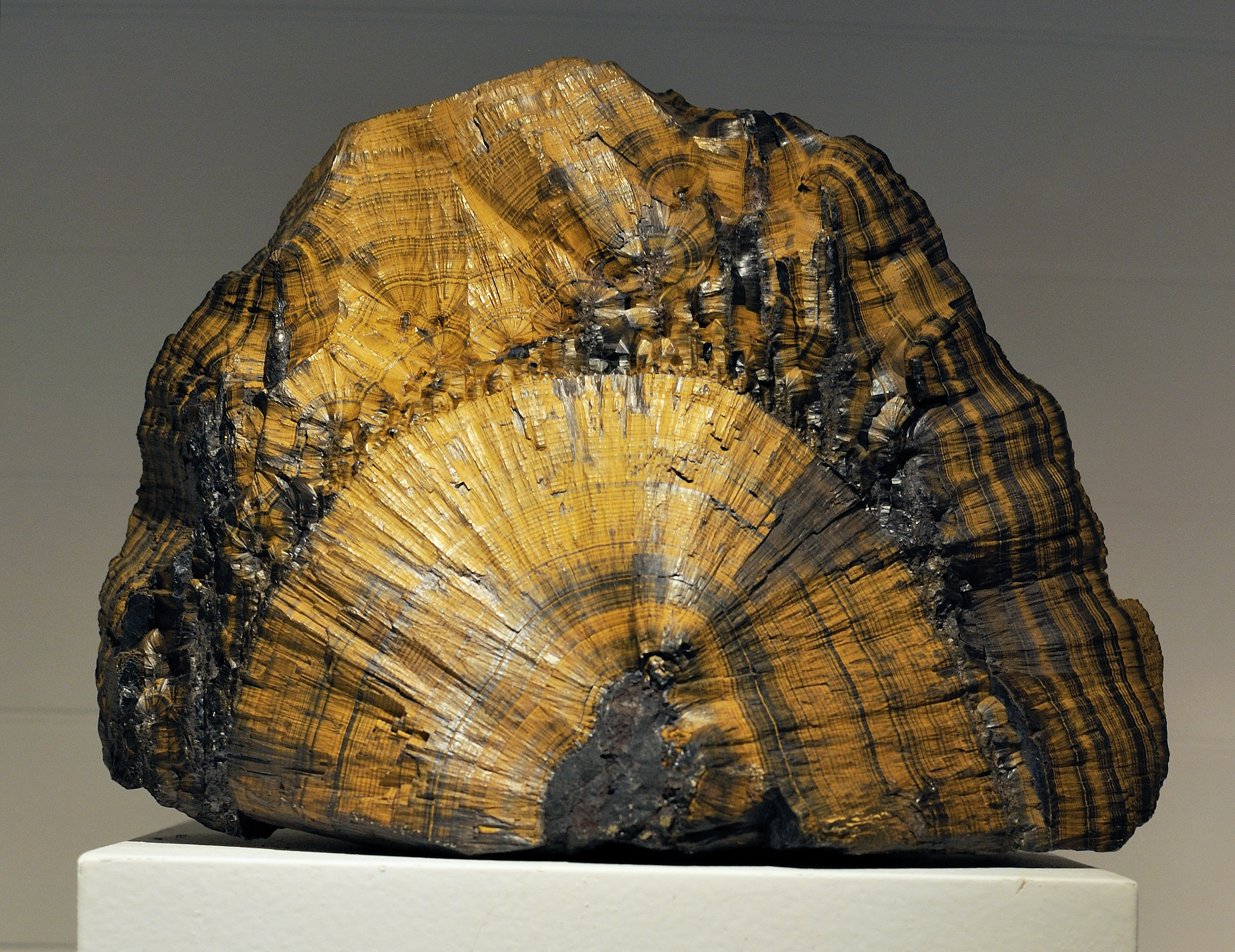
Goethite from Negaunee, Marquette County, Michigan

== See also ==
- Limpet teeth
- Ochre
- List of minerals
- List of minerals named after people
