= Lepidocrocite =

Iron oxide-hydroxide mineral

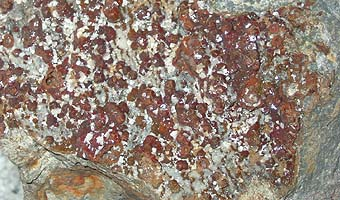
- A sample of lepidocrocite

General
- Category: Oxide minerals
- Formula: γ-FeO(OH)
- IMA symbol: Lpc
- Strunz classification: 4.FE.15
- Crystal system: Orthorhombic
- Crystal class: Dipyramidal (mmm); H-M symbol: (2/m 2/m 2/m)
- Space group: Cmcm
- Unit cell: a = 3.88, b = 12.54 c = 3.07 [Å]; Z = 4

Identification
- Formula mass: 88.85 g/mol
- Color: Ruby-red to reddish brown; light reddish to red-orange in transmitted light; gray-white in reflected light
- Crystal habit: Flattened scales aggregated into plumose groups and rosettes; massive, bladed to fibrous or micaceous
- Cleavage: {010} Perfect
- Mohs scale hardness: 5
- Luster: Submetallic
- Streak: Dull orange
- Diaphaneity: Transparent
- Specific gravity: 4
- Optical properties: Biaxial (−)
- Refractive index: n_{α} = 1.940 n_{β} = 2.200 n_{γ} = 2.510
- Birefringence: δ = 0.570
- Pleochroism: Strong; X = colorless to yellow; Y = orange, yellow, dark red-orange; Z = orange, yellow, darker red-orange
- 2V angle: Measured: 83°

Lepidocrocite (γ-FeO(OH)), also called esmeraldite or hydrohematite, is an iron oxide-hydroxide mineral. Lepidocrocite has an orthorhombic crystal structure, a hardness of 5, specific gravity of 4, a submetallic luster and a yellow-brown streak. It is red to reddish brown and forms when iron-containing substances rust underwater. Lepidocrocite is commonly found in the weathering of primary iron minerals and in iron ore deposits. It can be seen as rust scale inside old steel water pipes and water tanks.

The structure of lepidocrocite is similar to the boehmite structure found in bauxite and consists of layered iron(III) oxide octahedra bonded by hydrogen bonding via hydroxide layers. This relatively weakly bonded layering accounts for the scaley habit of the mineral.

It was first described in 1813 from the Zlaté Hory polymetallic ore deposit in Moravia, Czech Republic. The name is from the Greek lipis for scale and krokis for fibre.

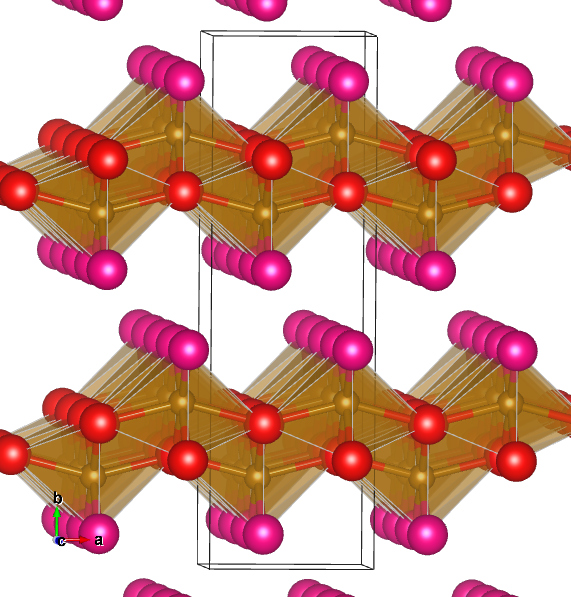
Layered crystal structure of lepidocrocite. Iron atoms shown as brown spheres; lattice oxygen as red spheres; and hydroxyl oxygen as magenta spheres. Hydrogen atoms are not shown.
