= Vartiokylä dumping ground =

Dumping ground in Helsinki

Coordinates: 60°13′08″N 025°04′18″E

The Vartiokylä dumping ground was a dumping ground in the Vartiokylä area of Helsinki between 1954 and 1962. It was located in the present-day neighbourhood of Myllypuro; the site is also known as the "Alakiventie Street area".

This dumping ground caused the best-known environmental disaster in the history of Helsinki. Part of the neighbourhood of Myllypuro was built on this site with no thought given to possible environmental hazards. In 1999, the city of Helsinki admitted that there was a problem with this neighbourhood and, as a result, apartment buildings on part of Alakiventie Street were torn down, and the land below was rehabilitated so as not to cause further problems.

== History ==
=== Building of the Krepost Sveaborg ===
An esker was located at the site, most likely the one called Botbyhöjden, which was subsequently named Puotinharju in Finnish. The gravel from this esker was used for the building of the coastal fortifications in 1915–17 that became known as Krepost Sveaborg.

=== History as a dumping ground ===
By the 1950s, the city began to use the hole in the esker for purposes other than storing gravel. The residents of Herttoniemi, closer to the city centre, and especially those living in single-family detached homes on Kitusentie, began to complain about the smell of the Herttoniemi dumping ground located at the intersection of Siilitie and Sopulitie at the time.

Due to the Herttoniemi residents' persistence, their neighbourhood dumping ground was closed and a new one opened in the Botbyhöjden gravel pit. This new location was more convenient in the sense that there was only one person living in its immediate vicinity, a certain Ossian Gauffin, who spoke French, Finnish and Swedish and who was of Wallonian origin.

According to local lore, before the pit was turned into a dumping ground, it was first lined with clay. After that municipal solid waste, carcasses of dead animals, waste oil and other types of industrial waste such as waste from the cleaning operations of a margarine factory, and sulphuric acid from the local gas works, both in liquid form and as silt, began to be taken there.

Soon the leaves in the woods next to the dumping ground turned yellow, and Gauffin was puzzled by the oil that had appeared in the ditches in the surrounding fields. The pollutants escaped from the dumping ground through the esker around it, and with ground and surface waters flowed further into the small wood below it. From there it flowed through ditches of the fields and the Mustapuro brook to the vicinity of the Marjaniemi allotment garden and on to the sea near the Marjaniemi public beach. Helsingin Sanomat reported this in July 1957 in an article headed "Waste oil destroys woods in Herttoniemi". The article noted:

Part of the wood in the slope has been destroyed, walking is dangerous in certain areas due to the layer of oil that covers the ground, and oil found in the ditches in the fields below the slope causes damage to the local agriculture.

The trees in the local woods were dead or dying or clearly damaged in an area that measured up to 2.5 hectares (6.2 acres). In addition to this, another hectare of the wood was facing a similar fate.

Now the city had to react to this revelation. Later the same year, the real property committee of the city forbade the disposal of waste oil and other hazardous waste materials at the dumping ground, but later, due to financial considerations, it had to allow the use of the site as the dumping ground of the Helsinki City Gas Works. The gas works was given special permission to continue to take its waste to the dumping ground, provided that it first neutralized the sulphuric acid waste with calcium oxide.

The city urged its public works department to guard the dumping ground more effectively — earlier it was not guarded at all, as was usual at the time — and to immediately take measures so that the hazards posed by the toxic waste already at the site could be minimised.

=== The end of the dumping ground ===
In the summer of 1962, the Vartiokylä dumping ground was closed, but not because of its environmental impact. The official story was that the place was full and could not accommodate further waste materials. Since it had originally been a hole from which gravel had been taken, it did not stick out from the surrounding areas, such as the Iso-Huopalahti dumping ground and the Vuosaari dumping ground did and still do. (These two dumping grounds now replaced the Vartiokylä dumping ground.) Thus, when the construction of the Myllypuro neighbourhood was begun, the new residents most likely were oblivious to the fact that there had once been such a site there.

Although officially the site was no longer a dumping ground, Helsingin Sanomat wrote in 1964 that: "The dumping ground has been closed for quite some time already, but still new loads of rubbish are quietly dumped along the road in the woods, next to the former site. The police has not been able to prevent this from happening".

== The Myllypuro neighbourhood ==
After the dump was closed, the area was levelled into a sand field, where pine saplings began to grow. Once a travelling circus erected its tent on this sand field.

In the 1970s, the area was found suitable for apartment buildings. The wastewater flowing down the brook in the slope of the hill and depressions in the ground were then the only indicators of the former nature of the place. Apartment buildings and a daycare centre were built on the site. Until the landscape was given its finishing touches, the most visible sign of the former dump was the light paint pigment in the bottom of the local brook.

== The problems emerge ==
During 1996–97 the ground and surface waters were examined in order to see if the gas porosity caused environmental stress. Nothing alarming was found in these tests.

However, in connection with work on the sewage system in November 1998, some earth was dug up which needed to be examined. In the same month, a company called Viatek began to investigate the soil at thirty neighbourhood locations, and the waters within the former dump in seven groundwater pipes. At the same time, air samples in the daycare centre, the after-school care centre, and from some of the apartments were collected (a total of six samples). When the examination of these was complete, the report showed that the concentrations exceed the guidelines of SAMASE (SAastuneiden MAa-alueiden SElvitys "Report on Contaminated Soils") project by several hundred times and that there was a large amount of contaminated soil. Polychlorinated biphenyls, Polycyclic aromatic hydrocarbons, volatile organic compounds as well as cyanide and heavy metals were found at the site.

In June 1999, the city arranged a briefing for the residents during which they learned of an evacuation plan that the city had devised. The residents were shocked. The final outcome of the investigations was that the apartment buildings were ordered to be demolished.

The city tenants were offered housing elsewhere, and the owners of the apartments at Alakiventie 8 were to be compensated by the city for their former “market value”. A dispute arose over the issue of "market value". Some of the people continued to live in their units up until early November 2003. In 2008, the Helsinki District Court ruled that the city was to compensate the former residents of Alakiventie 8 since they were forced to move elsewhere; the city was also compelled to pay legal costs. Alakiventie 4 was intended to be left standing but instead was demolished.

== The end result of the restoration works ==
A park was constructed on the site, in the middle of which a “cone” was built. The contaminated soil from the edges of the former dump was placed in this cone. The cone has been described as a “layered cake”, which has various layers insulating the “delicacies” of the core of the cone. The cone can be seen clearly on maps as a circle between the Roihupelto metro depot and the Ring I highway. It is 20 metres (66 ft) high, but it appears even higher due to the natural slopes of the esker below.
