= Vuosaarenhuippu =

Reclaimed landfill in Helsinki, Finland

Coordinates: 60°13′37″N 025°09′46″E

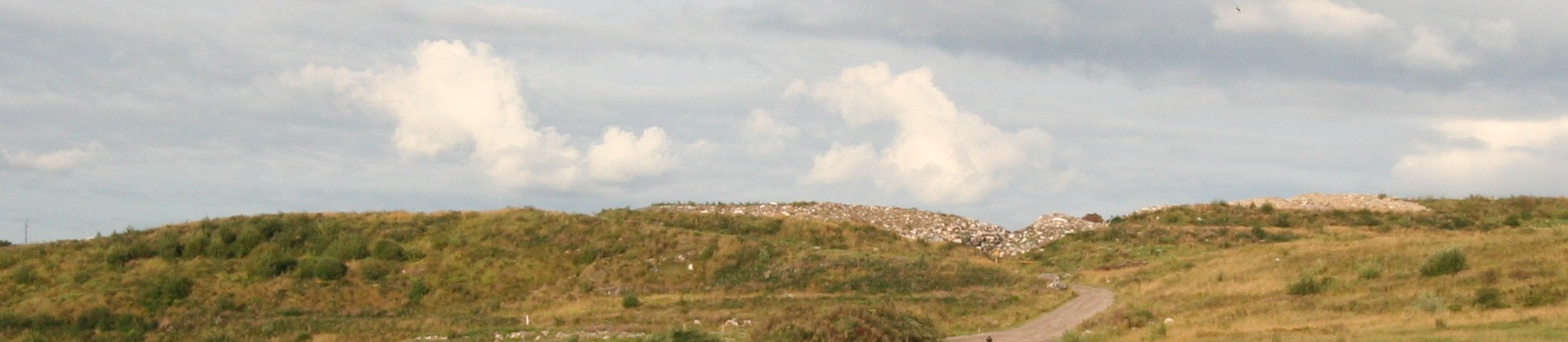
The top of the hill when approached from the road that used to lead to the dumping ground

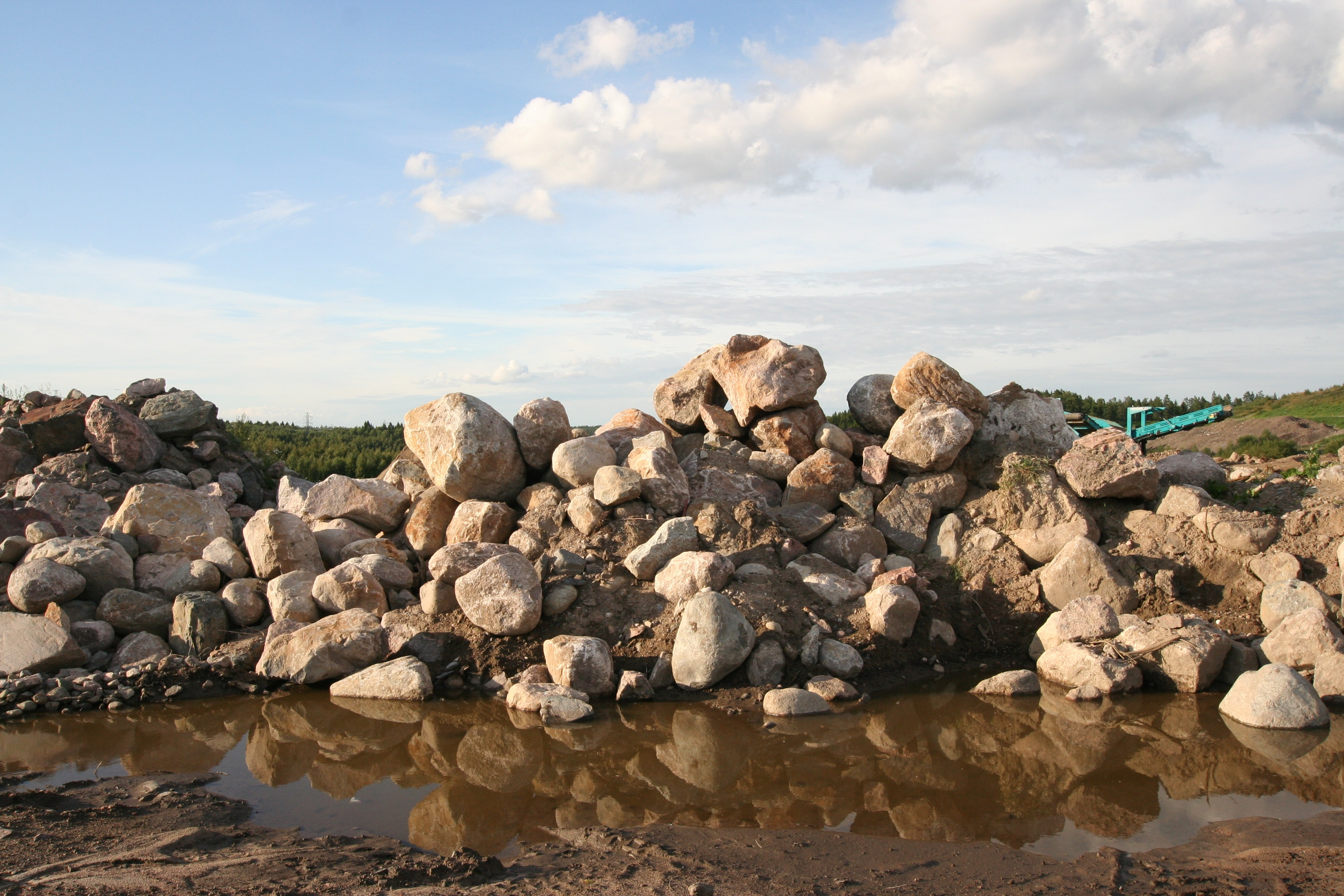
Piles of rocks waiting to be placed in the area

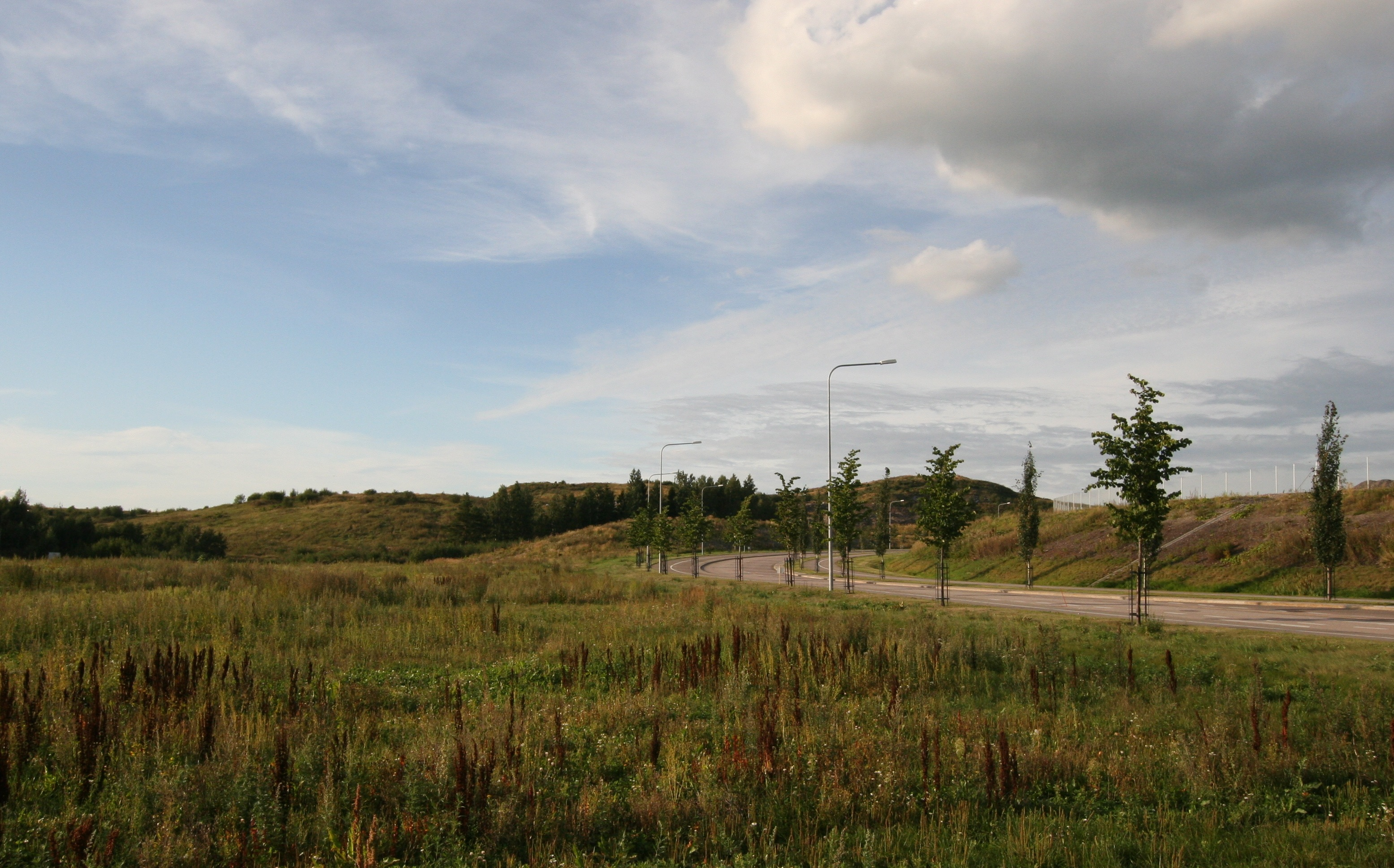
The top of the hill seen from Niinisaarentie

Vuosaarenhuippu is a recreational area in the northern part of Vuosaari in eastern Helsinki, Finland. Earlier it was the Vuosaari dumping ground and a place where land masses from construction sites were deposited. Through ecological restoration the area has been turned into a natural-like environment, the scale of which is unprecedented in the history of Helsinki. A large number of both flora and fauna inhabit the area. There are paths connecting the area to the nearby Mustavuori protected area.

== Dumping ground ==
=== History ===
Vuosaari dumping ground was a municipal dumping ground in the years 1966–1975 and 1979–1988. During the latter period, it was one of the "big three". The two others were the Iso-Huopalahti dumping ground and the Pasila dumping ground. The Vuosaari dumping ground is the second biggest dumping ground in the Nordic countries ever, second only to the current Ämmässuo dumping ground in Espoo, Finland. The waste taken there included domestic waste, industrial waste, and in all likelihood also hazardous waste.

==== Lohja Kalkkitehdas dumping ground ====
In the early 1960s, the Lohjan Kalkkitehdas Oy ('Lohja Burnt Chalk Factory') had a limestone quarry in the area and a dumping ground in the area. The quarry would later fill with water to become a pond. The speciality of the quarry was pink marble, which first mined by Lohjan Kalkki Oy and later Rudus Oy would retrieve slates from depths up to 60 metres (200 ft) deep. It seems that there was also a stone crushing plant operated in the area, since the local residents made a complaint about the dust it emitted. As a result of this complaint, it was found that the amount of dust in the air was harmful to human beings, and the company was ordered to manage its dust emissions. It is difficult to find more precise information on this phase of the dumping ground.

==== City of Helsinki dumping ground ====
The Vuosaari dumping ground was created officially after Vuosaari had been annexed to the city in 1966 and after the Vartiokylä dumping ground had become too full to be used any longer. At the time, Vuosaari was a remote place next to the city boundaries against Helsinki Rural Commune and Sipoo. In spite of the remote location, the nearest dwellings were located only 400 metres (1,300 ft) from the dumping ground. In addition, the place was unguarded and was full of rats and seagulls. The waste formed loose masses of matter and fires were frequent; the dense smoke from these fires was a severe inconvenience for the local residents.

From 1975 the dumping ground was temporarily out of service, but when the Iso-Huopalahti dumping ground closed, the city reopened it again. The residents considered it to be an illegal maneuver and were strongly opposed to it. It was said the site was still badly managed, as it was still unguarded, and it was claimed by the media to accept hazardous waste, such as poisons, petroleum derivatives and solvents. In 1980, the neighbourhood's housing cooperatives complained about the dumping ground to the health authorities, to the Helsinki Police Department and finally, to the Chancellor of Justice. Also, the Finnish Nature Conservation Society demanded that the dumping ground be closed. The Uusimaa Provincial Court banned the use of the site, and as the available sites for the city to dispose of were now even more limited waste, the importance of the Kyläsaari Waste Incineration Plant in the cities waste management system grew. Apparently, since the use of the site was now banned, it consequently became a guarded site in 1981.

It seems that domestic and industrial waste was no longer taken to Vuosaari, but supposedly landfill materials were still taken there until 1988. And some sources even identify the Vuosaari dumping ground as the main dumping ground for the city of Helsinki during the 1980s.

The site of the former dumping ground thus consists of two parts, the former dumping ground proper, which amounts to 25 hectares (62 acres), and the landfill hill, which apparently amounts to 35 hectares (86 acres).

Since 1983, the Helsinki Metropolitan Area Council has been responsible for the area. During its last years of operation, the dumping ground was repeatedly featured in the mass media. The closing of this site in all likelihood was due to negative public opinion resulting from this attention.

=== The amount and nature of the waste ===
A total of 3.4 million tons of municipal solid waste and 150,000 tons of industrial waste was taken to the site, though some sources claim only 1.7 million tons were accepted. In addition, construction waste, sulphur removal agents, solvents, hospital waste, ashes from coal power plants, precipitates and silt have also been disposed of there. Among these, there are polycyclic aromatic hydrocarbons, volatile organic compounds, heavy metals and sulphur compounds. In all likelihood, toxic wastes were also accepted.

=== Restoration ===
In the 1990s, a gas emission collection system was built in the area. It comprises 27 wells, plumbing, a pumping station, a flame incinerator, and a system of pipelines that takes the heat into a heating plant. After the dumping ground ceased accepting waste, substantial amounts of clean soil were placed on top of it. At some point, either before or after the use of the site as a dumping ground, the area was cordoned off with walls. In spite of this, the former dumping ground has been classified as a risky site, and the contents of the rainwater and water from melting snow that passes through the site are constantly being monitored.

=== Landscape restoration and landscape ===
The actual landscape restoration can take place only when the gas emissions from the landfill have ended. The new pipeline system is designed to accelerate the escaping process of the gases.

Soil has accumulated on the landfill hill for decades. The topsoil for the hill was brought from the construction site of the Vuosaari Harbour. Earthmovers have brought 80,000 cubic metres of earth from Käärmeniemi (the site of the harbour). The soil has been replaced in an innovative way, preserving the order of the original soil profile. Thus the top layer, with its organic matter, microbes, seeds and organisms intact was placed on the top, so that after they have recovered from the shock of the transfer, they can start a new life at the new location. Certain precious soil types with their plants were even transported on stretchers as if they had been human patients. Thus plants, organisms and mycelia will continue growing in the new location. Since the height of the hill is considerable because of the large amount of materials deposited, the hill can be seen from afar, and from the top of the hill, one can see most of the surrounding areas.

But after all this had been going on for quite some time already, the plans changed again. One commentator said that

finally the creators of the hill had a spark of inspiration: they decided that the hill would become something unique. Some kind of fantastic pseudoperiphery. A postmodern wasteland. A fell. Just like Lapland, with all its snags and gorges.

The landscape restoration by the City of Helsinki Public Works Department, and especially the head of its workshop, Mr. Jukka Toivonen, has been lauded by The Finnish Association for Nature Conservation, and they have received the Countdown Prize from the Finnish IUCN Committee. According to the commentator quoted above,

quite appropriately. The viper has climbed up the sunny hill, the horned lark has accepted it as its winter home, the large copper has laid its endangered eggs there. The vascular plants have 400 species here. The landfill hill have become a sanctuary to those species that spread by themselves, and as we have been promised, to the evacuees of the present and future sites that will be destroyed.

Inspiration for the landscape design has been drawn from the biotopes of the outer islands of Finland's archipelagos, the open slopes of heights, increasingly rare types of groves and the grazed traditional landscape, such as the dale of Häntälä in Somero.

In the summer of 2014, soil taken from the future residential neighbourhood of Kruunuvuorenranta has been brought here. The landscape designers are eagerly waiting to see what kind of plants will emerge from the seeds in that soil.

== The present state of the site ==
Although the city of Helsinki began the landscape restoration only in 2003, over 400 plant species are found here, as well as many rare or endangered animal species. A significant part of the flora of the landfill area has originally come here with the top soils chosen from construction sites, either as already in plant form or as seeds. The Vuosaarenhuippu area is a kind of a reservation, into which it is possible to transfer rare and regional plant species which are overrun by the expanding development of the city.

As a result of the accumulation of land masses, the hill is a rather high one, and it can be seen from afar, and from the top, one can also see most of the surrounding areas. At the highest spot, at an elevation of 65 metres (213 ft), there is a scenic spot, from which one can see a view to e.g. the Vuosaari Harbour.

From the north, there is an accessible route to the highest point of the hill. The accessible route begins at the parking lot next to Niinisaarentie Street, and it proceeds along the official route. The route proceeds between the old dumping ground and the reed growth of the Porvarinlahti Bay and on to the northwestern slope of the hill. From there the route climbs up the slope to the northern point of the hilltop.

From the south, however, there is no route accessible for all. The most obvious route, and the shortest, as the crow flies, from Niinisaarentie to the eastern slope is not open to the public.

STARA, the service provider of the City of Helsinki, writes the following on the site:

The hill offers all kinds of peculiar things, such as a large marshlike pond, a ragged gorge, and “planted” snags. An area with wild strawberries has emerged there. Natural plants have been collected from the coastline, and cuttings have been taken from them. Rocks have been transported here from the various construction sites in Helsinki.

The idea with the hill is to approximate views in a fell. Thus we have planted low plants that usually exist in ragged environments such as junipers, heather and thymuses. The stump of the willow that grew next to Lasipalatsi in the city centre was brought here on 2 August 2007. Other stumps have also been placed there, and a beautiful wall of stone has been constructed just so people could have something to wonder about.

Paths circle around in the area, and the network of paths will in the future serve both local and regional recreational purposes. Some of the paths will have street lights, and also a horse riding route, a cycling course, and in the winter skiing tracks with street lights, as well as slopes suited for snowboarding and alpine skiing will be prepared.

The initiator of the project is nature gardener Jukka Toivonen assisted by enthusiastic summer workers. Toivonen did not want to create a conventional park in the area. That is why the landfill hill has been left with depressions, and in places, the landscape is quite ragged with rocks. Toivonen believes that in 10 years' time, the area will be one of the finest in Helsinki, and in 30 years' time one will no longer notice that human activity has been involved in the creation of the area.

Foxes, mooses and vipers have already chosen the hill as their home. Even a lynx has been sighted. An excellent view opens up from the top to all directions, which is why the place is well suited to sighting of birds of prey. Several rare birds of this kind have already been spotted in this "Himalaya", such as the long-legged buzzard and the short-toed snake eagle. Of other birds, one might mention the European goldfinch, the twite and the horned lark. The landfill hill has received several prizes for promoting the diversity of the natural environment
