= Warsangli linnet =

Conservation status
- Near Threatened (IUCN 3.1)

Scientific classification
- Kingdom: Animalia
- Phylum: Chordata
- Class: Aves
- Order: Passeriformes
- Family: Fringillidae
- Subfamily: Carduelinae
- Genus: Linaria
- Species: L. johannis

Binomial name
- Linaria johannis (Clarke, 1919)

Species of bird

The Warsangli linnet (Linaria johannis) is a species of finch in the family Fringillidae. It is found only in Somalia. Its natural habitats are subtropical or tropical dry forest and subtropical or tropical high-altitude shrubland. It is threatened by habitat loss.

The Warsangli linnet has not yet been examined genetically; it was formerly placed in the genus Carduelis but was assigned to the genus Linaria based on its plumage similarities to the common linnet Linaria cannabina.
