= Pikku Huopalahti dumping ground =

Coordinates: 60°11′N 024°54′E

The Pikku Huopalahti dumping ground was a dumping ground in Pikku Huopalahti, Helsinki between 1937 and 1949.

== History and nature of the dumping ground ==
This was a small-scale dumping ground, which was a modest and a harmless one. Domestic waste, paper and ashes were taken there. No industrial waste was taken there, but quite a few of it ended up there as a result of other operations.

Both the beginning and the end of the dumping ground are to some extent unknown. It is thought that it was begun in 1937, on a clay soil. It is thought that the beginning is connected to the building of the Tilkka Military Hospital, which represents the functionalist style and was completed in 1936. The dumping activity probably came to an end when the Pasila dumping ground was taken to use in 1949 and replaced the one in Pikku-Huopalahti.

== Poor man’s Stockmann ==
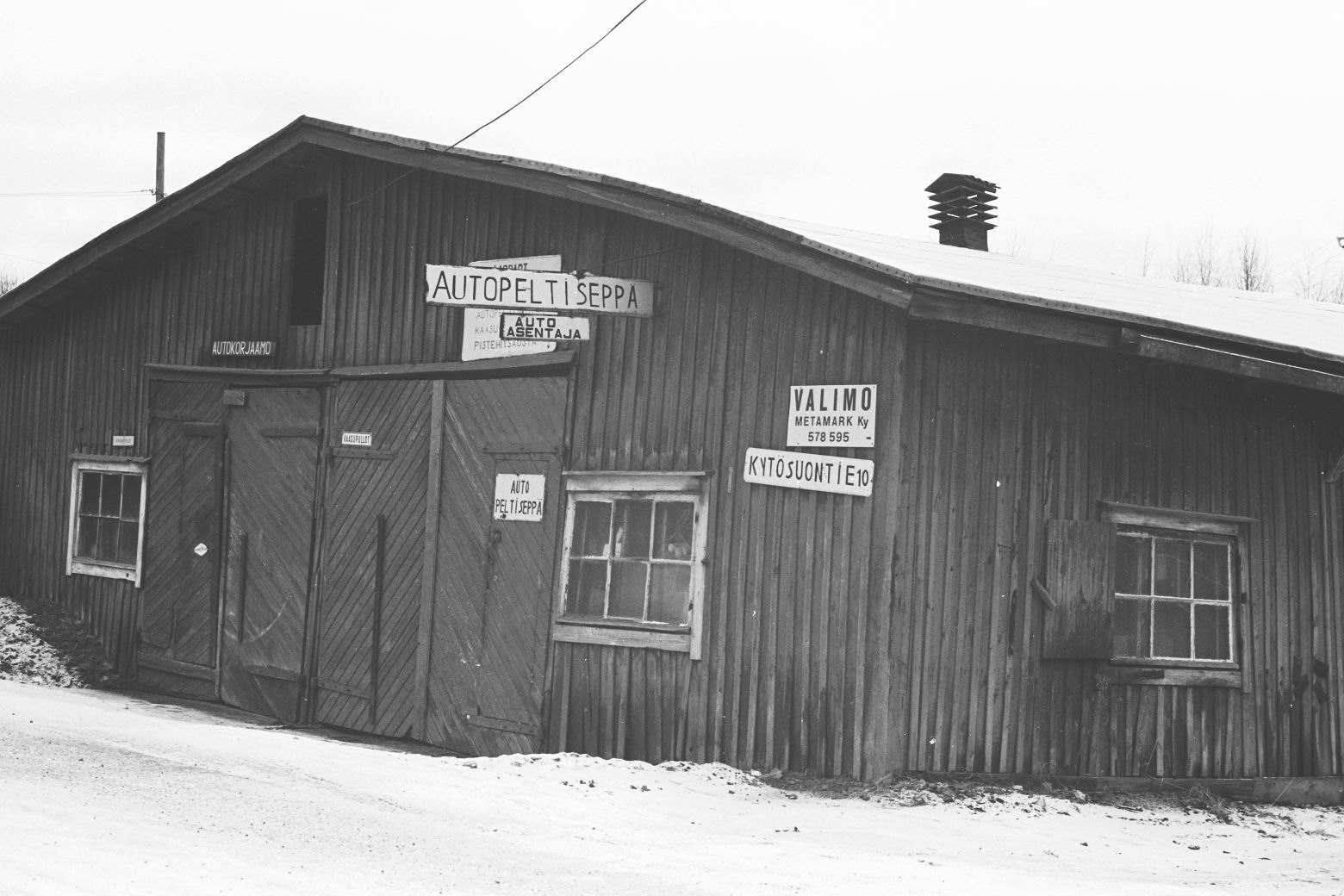
A car repair shop in Poor man’s Stockmann in November 1970

After the place was no longer officially a dumping ground, it still looked like it for decades. The place and its surroundings were then known locally as Poor man’s Stockmann, the reference being both to the wide range of “goods” found in the area and to the Stockmann Department Store in Helsinki City Centre. The area was located between Tilkka and the Pikku-Huopalahti Bay.

The economic activity in the area consisted of various kinds of small-scale manufacturing industry and businesses, e.g. demolition of cars, and, it seems, junk yards and second-hand stores. It is possible that the rubbish generated was not transported anywhere else but remained at the site. The dumping ground was covered with earth and blaste stone, but the soil was polluted because of the economic activity. Heavy metals, oil and hydrocarbons were found in the soil.

The Finnish Member of Parliament Osmo Soininvaara mentions Poor man’s Stockmann in his blog and gives the impression that the wrecking yard business in the area emerged more or less spontaneously, outside of urban planning, and possibly without any kinds of permits applied.

Poor man’s Stockmann still existed in the 1980s. Some scenes of the Uuno Turhapuro films were shot there, those that took place at the car repair shop where Härski Hartikainen and Sörsselssön worked.

== The area today ==
The original dumping ground is no longer visible on the site, since for all practical purposes it has disappeared decades ago.

The site was cleaned up before the new residential district of Pikku Huopalahti was built in the 1990s. The site was investigated, and the soil of the garden plots now found on the Niemenmäki side was changed. Elsewhere the former matter of the dumping ground is isolated by a special layer of landfill, and the top soil is new. The rubbish itself has decayed completely.
