= Effective porosity =

Part of the porosity in which a given fluid can flow

Effective porosity is most commonly considered to represent the porosity of a rock or sediment available to contribute to fluid flow through the rock or sediment, or often in terms of "flow to a borehole". Porosity that is not considered "effective porosity" includes water bound to clay particles (known as bound water) and isolated "vuggy" porosity (vugs not connected to other pores, or dead-end pores). The effective porosity is of great importance in considering the suitability of rocks or sediments as oil or gas reservoirs, or as aquifers.

The term lacks a single or straightforward definition. Even some of the terms used in its mathematical description ("$V_{cl}$” and “$V_{sh}$”) have multiple definitions.

== Background for multiple definitions ==
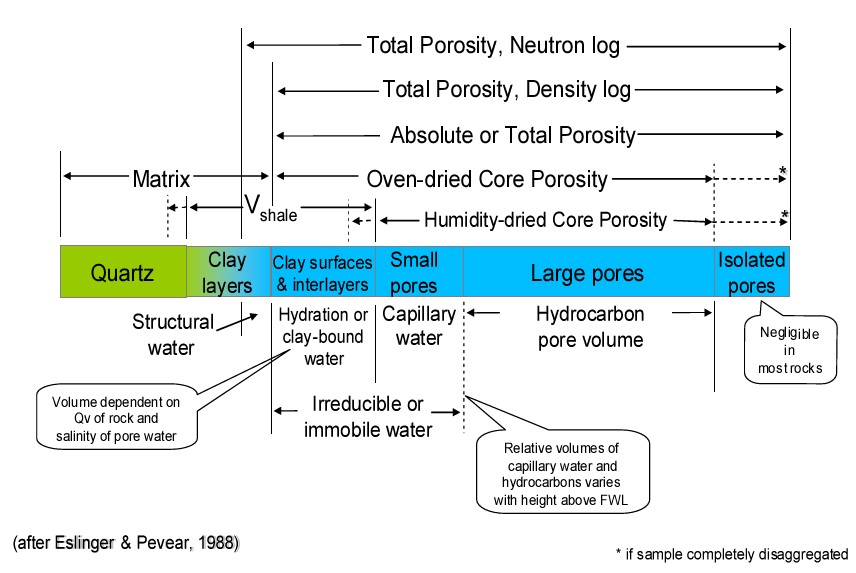
The components of the gross rock (bulk) volume as a strip. The individual components are not to scale. For example, porosity and pore volume are over-emphasised for illustrative purposes. Adapted from Eslinger and Pevear

=== Quartz ===
"Quartz" (more aptly termed “non-clay minerals”) forms part of the matrix, or in core analysis terms, part of the grain volume.

=== Clay layers ===
"Clay layers" are dry clay (V_{cl}) which also form part of the grain volume. If a core sample is dried in a normal dry oven (non-humidified atmosphere) the clay layers and quartz together form the grain volume, with all other components constituting core analysis “total porosity” (notwithstanding comments in). This core total porosity will generally be equivalent to the total porosity derived from the density log when representative values for matrix and fluid density are used.

The clay layers contain OH^{−} groups (often termed “structural water”). This structural water is never part of the pore volume. However, since neutron logs sense H (hydrogen) and all hydrogen so-sensed is allocated as pore space, then neutron logs will overestimate porosity in argillaceous rocks by sensing OH^{−} as part of the pore space.

=== Clay surfaces and interlayers ===
“Clay surfaces and interlayers” comprise electrochemically bound water (clay-bound water or CBW) which varies in volume according to the clay-type, and the salinity of the formation water (see the Attachments section). The most common definition of effective porosity for sandstones excludes CBW as part of the porosity, whereas CBW is included as part of the total porosity. That is:

$$\text{Effective porosity} = \text{Total porosity} - \text{CBW}$$

To assess the effective porosity, samples are dried at 40-45% relative humidity and 60 °C. This means that one to two molecular layers of CBW can be retained, and a form of “effective porosity” can be measured on the samples. However, the CBW retained by the humidity-dried core plugs is not necessarily representative of CBW in the formation at reservoir conditions. This lack of reservoir representation occurs not only because CBW tends to a minimum value in cores humidity-dried at the specified conditions but also because the amount of CBW at reservoir conditions varies with the salinity of formation water in the “effective” pore space. Humidity-dried cores have no water in the “effective” pore space, and therefore can never truly represent the reservoir CBW condition. A further complication can arise in that humidity drying of cores may sometimes leave water of condensation in clay-free micropores.

Log derivation of effective porosity includes CBW as part of the volume of shale (V_{sh}). V_{sh} is greater than the volume of V_{cl} not only because it incorporates CBW, but also because V_{sh} includes clay size (and silt-size) quartz (and other mineral) grains, not just pure clay.

=== Small pores ===
"Small pores” contain capillary water which is different from CBW in that it is physically (not electrochemically) bound to the rock (by capillary forces). Capillary water generally forms part of the effective pore space for both log and core analysis. However, microporous pore space associated with shales (where water is held by capillary forces and hence is not true CBW) is usually estimated as part of the V_{sh} by logs and therefore not included as part of the effective porosity. The total water associated with shales is more properly termed “shale water” which is larger in value than CBW. If we humidity dried core samples, (some of) the electrochemically bound CBW would be retained, but none of the capillary-bound microporous water (notwithstanding comments in). Therefore, although the figure infers that a humidity-dried core could produce an effective porosity similar to a log analysis effective porosity, the effective porosity from the core will usually be higher (see “Examples” section)—notwithstanding comments in. Traditionally, true CBW has been directly measured neither on cores nor by logs, although NMR measurement holds promise.

At a given height above the free-water level, the capillary water becomes “irreducible”. This capillary water forms the irreducible water saturation (“Swi”) with respect to effective porosity (notwithstanding the inclusion of microporous water as V_{sh} during the log analysis) whereas for total porosity, the CBW and capillary water combined form the “Swi”.

=== Large pores ===
”Large pores” contain hydrocarbons (in a hydrocarbon bearing formation). Above the transition zone, only hydrocarbons will flow. Effective porosity (with reference to the figure below) can be classified as only the hydrocarbon-filled large pore spaces above the transition zone.

Anecdotally, effective pore space has been equated to displaceable hydrocarbon pore volume. In this context, if residual hydrocarbon saturation were calculated at 20%, then only 80% of the hydrocarbon-filled pores in the figure would constitute effective pore space.

=== Isolated pores ===
“Isolated pores” in clastics, and most carbonates, make a negligible contribution to porosity. There are exceptions. In some carbonates, for example, the tests of microscopic organisms can become calcified to create significant isolated intra-particular pore space which is not connected to the inter-particular pore space available for hydrocarbon storage and flow. In such cases, core analysis will only record the inter-particular pore space, or “effective porosity”, whereas the density and neutron logs will record the total pore space. Only by crushing the rock can the core analysis yield the total porosity seen by the logs. The traditional Petroleum Engineering and core analysis definition of effective porosity is the sum of the interconnected pore space—that is, excluding isolated pores. Therefore, in practice, for the vast majority of sedimentary rocks, this definition of effective porosity equates to total porosity.

== Summary of terms ==
Summary of terms using the Eslinger & Pevear concepts

Total porosity
The volume of the reservoir rock which is fluid (oil, water, gas) filled, expressed as a percentage or a fraction of the gross (bulk) rock volume.

Effective porosity $\phi_{e1}$
The sum of all the interconnected pore space. In the vast majority of cases, this core analysis and Petroleum Engineering definition of effective porosity equates to total porosity.

Effective porosity $\phi_{e2}$
Effective porosity measured on core samples which are dried in a humidity oven so that clays retain one or two molecular layers of bound water—however, this CBW tends to a minimum and is likely not reservoir representative.

Effective porosity $\phi_{e3}$
Total porosity minus clay-bound water (CBW).

Effective porosity $\phi_{e4}$
Log effective porosity. In essence, total porosity minus shale water, where solid minerals and the volume of shale (Vsh) constitute the matrix (non-effective porosity) and the remaining volume constitutes the effective porosity. For practical purposes, Vsh includes solid clays and the clay-sized and silt-sized fraction of non-clay minerals plus CBW and capillary bound water associated with shale micropores.

Effective porosity $\phi_{e5}$
In a hydrocarbon-bearing reservoir above the transition zone, only that pore space which is filled with hydrocarbons. From the NMR log, this equates to the Free Fluid Index (FFI), in other words, all pore space above the T2 cut-off.
Effective porosity and micro-porosity determination can be determined from NMR T2 distribution as well from the capillary pressure curve. The cumulative distribution for the fully saturated sample is compared to the cumulative distribution after centrifuging at 100 psi. The cutoff time which separates the T2 distribution into macro-porosity and micro-porosity is defined as the relaxation time at the point where the cumulative porosity of the fully saturated sample equals the irreducible water saturation.

Effective porosity $\phi_{e6}$
The volume of pore space which contains only producible hydrocarbons.

Clay-bound water (CBW)
The amount of Clay-bound water is determined by the following equation

$\text{CBW} = \phi_t \cdot \text{SF} \cdot \text{Qv}$

where $\phi_t$ is total porosity, $\text{SF}$ is salinity factor
and $\text{Qv}$ is the Cation Exchange Capacity, meq/ml pore space

Salinity factor (SF)
$$0.6425 \cdot S^{-0.5} + 0.22$$
where S is the salinity in g/L,

== Examples ==
A dramatic example of a core effective porosity vs log effective porosity discrepancy comes from some Greensand reservoirs in Western Australia. Greensands are green because of iron-bearing glauconite which is usually recognized as illite/mica or mixed layer illite-smectite clay by x-ray diffraction. The glauconite per se will incorporate electrochemically bound water (CBW) because of the clay types. More importantly for the consideration of effective porosity, though, glauconite grains (part of the Vsh) have intra-particular microporous pore space which retains capillary-bound water. Glauconite can constitute a large percentage of the reservoir rock, and therefore the associated intra-particular pore space can be significant. Log effective porosities calculated at 25% in some Greensand reservoirs have yielded core analysis effective porosities of 35% at equivalent depths. The difference is the glauconitic microporosity which contains water at reservoir conditions and is included as part of the Vsh (non-effective porosity) by log analysis. However, glauconitic microporosity is measured as part of the effective porosity in core plugs, even if they are humidity dried.

Greensands may cause varying degrees of difficulty for porosity log analysis. OH^{−} radicals affect neutron logs; the iron component is troublesome, and varying clay hydration needs to be considered for density log interpretation. The iron component affects the NMR logs and clay affects the sonic log. Therefore, it is essential to have a core - or at least a good understanding of the geology - before invoking total vs effective porosity relationships.

== See also ==
- Bulk density
- Porosity
- Gas porosity

== Notes ==
- Vcl has been expressed as: dry clay; dry clay plus CBW. Vsh has been described as: dry clay plus CBW (one version of a “perfect shale”); dry clay, CBW plus silt (the Dual Water “perfect shale” in the diagram above; dry clay, silt, CBW plus shale microporous water (the “practical shale”).
- Different derivations of effective porosity are not necessarily mutually exclusive. Moreover, the unifying underlying theme is interconnected pore space even though unconnected pore space may result from a number of different mechanisms, such as physically isolated pores created by calcified fossils or flow-isolated microporosity.
- No matter what definition of porosity is used, the calculated hydrocarbon-in-place should always be the same. For this reason, hydrocarbon-in-place can be expressed as a percentage of the total (gross) rock volume thereby bypassing the issue of porosity altogether. However, since current logging tools cannot directly sense hydrocarbon alone, the intermediate step of porosity calculation is still a basic necessity.
