= Herttoniemi dumping ground =

Dumping ground in Helsinki, Finland

Coordinates: 60°12′56″N 025°02′33″E

The Herttoniemi dumping ground was a small dumping ground in the northern part of the Herttoniemi neighbourhood in Helsinki. It was in operation during the years 1948–1953. It was founded in an old gravel pit near the Siilitie and Viikintie intersection. It was also known as the Sopulitie dumping ground.

The area of the former dumping ground was 5,700 square metres (61,000 sq ft), and its ground consisted of sand, and there were no ground water areas nearby. Only municipal solid waste and slaughterhouse waste was taken there. The history of this dumping ground turned out to be short, as the residents of Herttoniemi, especially those living in single-family detached homes on Kitusentie, began to complain about the smell of the dumping ground. Due to the persistence of the residents, the dumping ground located in their neighbourhood was closed, and a new one was opened in the Botbyhöjden gravel pit. It became known as the Vartiokylä dumping ground.

The landfill of this dumping ground was allowed to decompose between 1953 and 2002. After this new town plans were made for this site, and apartment buildings were planned for it. All of the landfill, down to the basement rock, was taken away, and clean earth was brought to replace it. The restoration work was undertaken in 2002.

The landfill was taken to a modern dumping ground. The matter was already completely decomposed. Only materials such as glass, porcelain, film and metal objects could be discerned. The earth was not contaminated to any significant degree. Some hazardous materials were found, however. Among these were e.g. polycyclic aromatic hydrocarbons and heavy metals.
