= Bound water =

Thin layer of water surrounding mineral surfaces

In hydrology, bound water, is an extremely thin layer of water surrounding mineral surfaces.

Water molecules have a strong electrical polarity, meaning that there is a very strong positive charge on one side of the molecule and a strong negative charge on the other. This causes the water molecules to bond to each other and to other charged surfaces, such as soil minerals. Clay in particular has a high ability to bond with water molecules.

The strong attraction between these surfaces causes an extremely thin water film (a few molecules thick) to form on the mineral surface. These water molecules are much less mobile than the rest of the water in the soil, and have significant effects on soil dielectric permittivity and freezing-thawing.

In molecular biology and food science, bound water refers to the amount of water in body tissues which are bound to macromolecules or organelles. In food science this form of water is practically unavailable for microbiological activities so it would not cause quality decreases or pathogen increases.

== See also ==
- Adsorption
- Capillary action
- Effective porosity
- Surface tension
