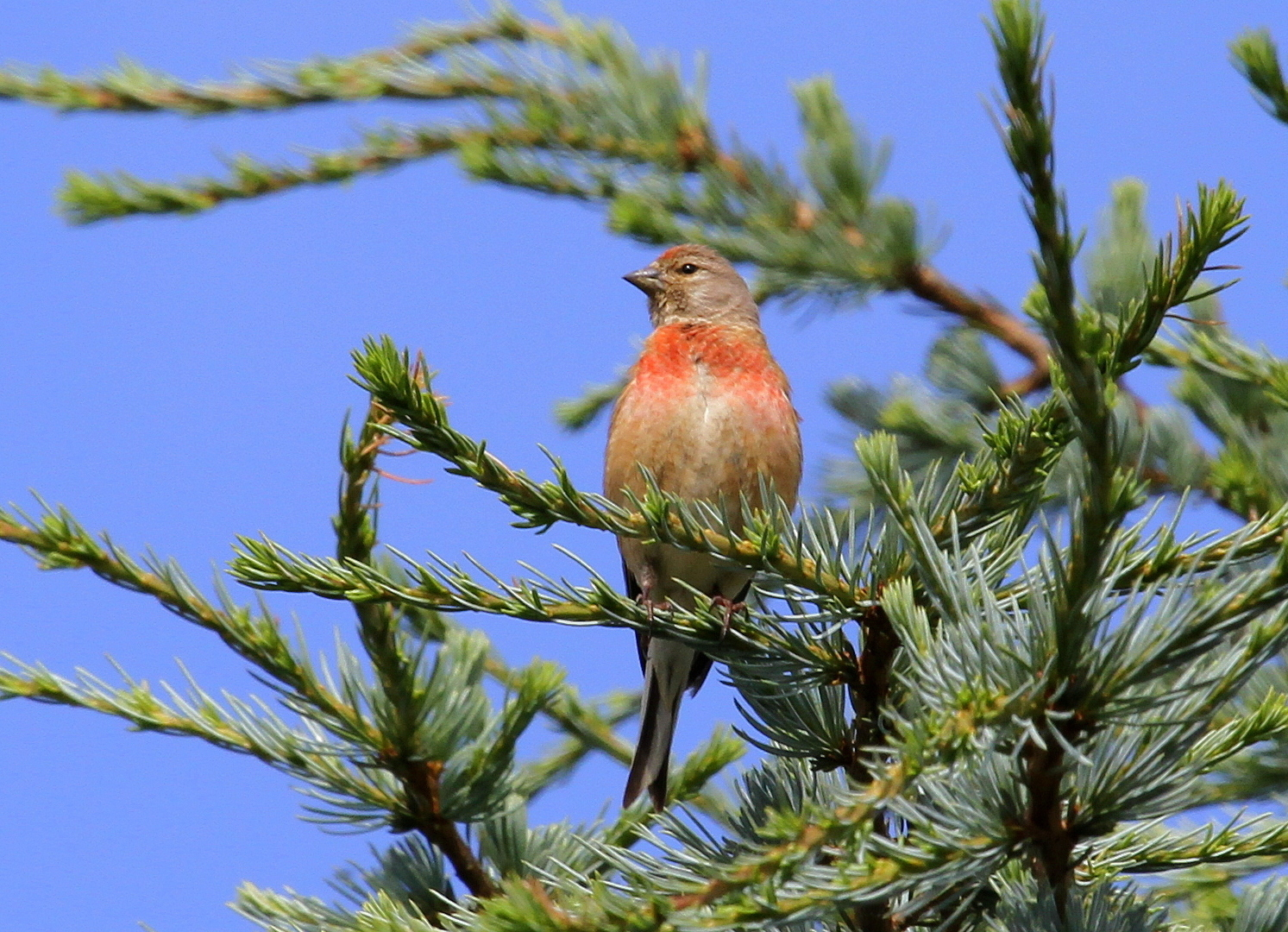
- Male common linnet (Linaria cannabina) in breeding plumage

Scientific classification
- Kingdom: Animalia
- Phylum: Chordata
- Class: Aves
- Order: Passeriformes
- Family: Fringillidae
- Subfamily: Carduelinae
- Genus: Linaria; Bechstein, 1802

Type species
- Fringilla cannabina Linnaeus, 1758

Species
- See text

= Linaria (bird) =

Genus of birds

Linaria is a genus of small passerine birds in the finch family (Fringillidae) that contains the twite and the linnets. The genus name linaria is the Latin for a linen-weaver, from linum, "flax".

The species were formerly included in the genus Carduelis. A molecular phylogenetic study using mitochondrial and nuclear DNA sequences published in 2012 found that the genus was polyphyletic. It was therefore split into monophyletic genera and the twite and the linnets moved to the resurrected genus Linaria. The name had originally been introduced in 1802 by the German naturalist Johann Matthäus Bechstein.

== Species ==
The genus contains the following four species:

| Image | Scientific name | Common name | Distribution |
|---|---|---|---|
| | Linaria flavirostris | Twite | northern Europe and across central Asia |
| | Linaria cannabina | Common linnet | Europe, western Asia and north Africa |
| | Linaria yemenensis | Yemen linnet | Saudi Arabia and Yemen |
| | Linaria johannis | Warsangli linnet | Somalia |
