= Talinhuippu =

Former dumping ground at the boundary between Helsinki and Espoo

Coordinates: 60°12′46″N 024°50′48″E

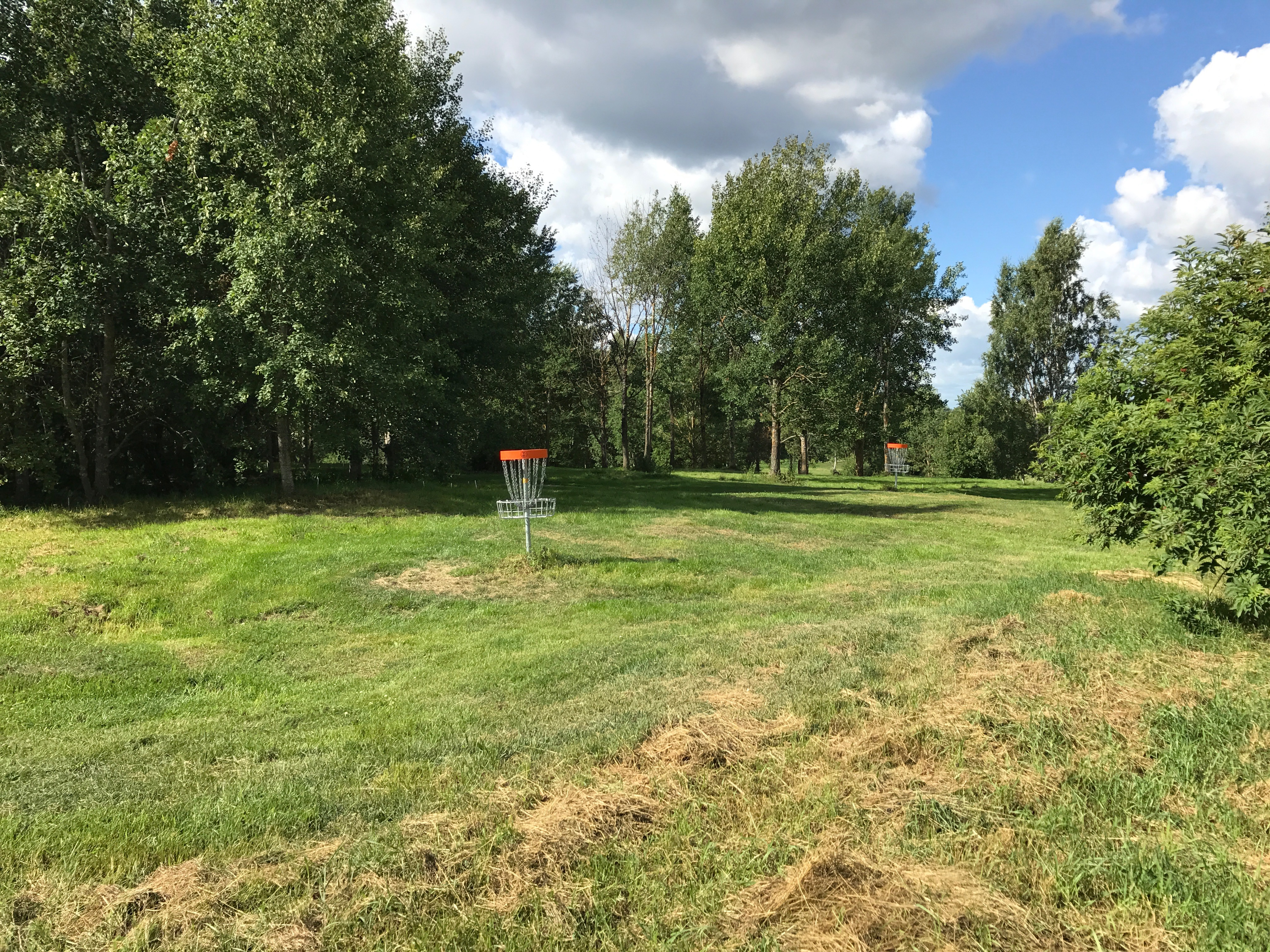

Talinhuippu (‘The Tali hilltop’) is a former dumping ground known as the Iso-Huopalahti dumping ground and was one of the “big three” dumping grounds in Helsinki at the time it was in operation. The site is located at the boundary between Helsinki and Espoo and was in use from 1963 to 1979. It is located between Talinranta, the Tali Golf Course and the Vermo harness racing track, on the northern shore of the Laajalahti Bay, north of Tarvo Island and Finnish national road 1.

== History ==
The Iso-Huopalahti dumping ground was one of the big three rubbish dumps in Helsinki. The other two were the Pasila dumping ground (1949–63, before 1949 the Finnish State Railways dumping ground) and the Vuosaari dumping ground (1966–1975 ja 1979–1988).

After the Pasila dumping ground was closed, the Iso-Huopalahti dumping ground became the main dumping ground of Helsinki. It was located near the Tali sewage treatment plant and the Tali Golf Course, between the brooks of Mätäjoki and Monikonpuro. It was earlier a shoreline meadow, but then the top soil was removed and the landfill with the dump was begun on top of clay land. At the end of the 1960s, the dumping ground was enlarged so that it ended up covering parts of the bay as well. Blasted stone was used to separate the rubbish from the seawater. Most of the rubbish accumulated during the 1970s. In the end much more accumulated than the clay base could bear, since there was no alternative at the time. Finally, the dumping ground sank so that the rubbish from the 1960s is now below the water line. The total amount of the waste is around 3.5 million cubic metres (120×10^{6} cu ft).

In the 1960s and 1970s, those driving along the Finnish national road 1 toward Turku (then called the Tarvo Highway, from the nearby Tarvo Island), could see the nature of the place easily from a distance. Also noticeable were the great amounts of seagulls.

== Talinhuippu today ==
Outwardly Talinhuippu Hill looks like any landfill site, and due to the growth of the trees, it can no longer be discerned from natural hills. The view to the Laajalahti Bay is beginning to grow when the gas emissions from the dumping ground ceased. Earlier these emissions prevented the growth of flora at the site.

The area has recreational paths and minor roads connected to the nearby Vermo harness racing track and a training ground owned by the city of Helsinki, and used e.g. by Helsingin Palveluskoiraharrastajat ry (‘The Helsinki Care Dog Society’) and other associations. In addition to this, the area has a frisbee golf course, which is 1,865 metres (6,119 ft) long with a par of 58. In the winter, the Tali Golf Course skiing tracks (6.5 kilometres [4.0 mi]) extend to Talinhuippu and beyond.
