= Pasila dumping ground =

Former landfill in Helsinki, Finland

The Pasila dumping ground was a dumping ground in Ilmala, Helsinki between 1949 and 1963. It was the main dumping ground of the city at the time, one of the “big three”. The other two were the Iso-Huopalahti dumping ground and the Vuosaari dumping ground. It was located at the present site of the Ilmala Railyard. Before 1949 it was the main dumping ground of the Finnish State Railways. Technically the site is part of the Pasila neighbourhood.

Household waste and industrial waste were taken to the site, and the place was not guarded.

== History ==
=== Finnish State Railways dumping ground ===
The Finnish State Railways first used the site to dispose of its used cross ties, sinking them into the local marsh.

=== City of Helsinki dumping ground ===
Helsinki started using the site as its dumping ground in 1949. At first, the area was filled from the east, and the process continued towards the west. Many fires occurred at the site, and sometimes even the old railroad ties underneath caught fire. It is estimated that around 9 million square metres (97×10^{6} sq ft) of waste was taken to the site. The area of the site was 40 hectares (99 acres).

=== Finnish State Railways railyard ===
The use of the site as a dumping ground came to an end when the Iso-Huopalahti dumping ground started operating. Land was brought to the area, and it was levelled into a sand field. Then the area was left to settle for seven years, after which, in 1970, the first tracks and a hall for passenger cars were built. The area became the railroad depot for the passenger cars of the State Railways.

Later a sorting station for the Finnish Postal Service as well as a depot for Pohjolan Liikenne was built in the western fringes of the area. From time to time, the ground has caved in, and during the 2000s major repairs of the area were required, as holes have appeared in the ground and the tracks have sunk in places. The city of Helsinki has estimated the repair works will not incur significant costs.

== The site at present ==
The area is now in use that resembles industrial use, and the dumping ground can not be discerned any longer. The waste has decomposed completely.

Despite the city's estimates that the area will not give rise to significant costs, a scientist who studied the topic has stated:

Of the [old 28] dumping grounds, Pasila is the most problematic, and the biggest concentrations of hazardous chemicals have been measured there. In monitoring the waters inside the former dump, the concentrations of several hazardous chemicals have exceeded the requirements established for drinking water.

Even though the dumping ground has officially not existed for decades the site still contained wrecked cars in 2006 when photos of the site were posted to the internet.

== Present effects on the surrounding areas ==
A lake, Huopalahdenjärvi, existed at the site of the dumping ground in the 19th century. The waters of this area, now known as Pohjois-Pasila flow down the Kumpulanpuro brook into Kumpula and into the sea in Vanhankaupunginselkä Bay.

Earlier these waters were directed to an industrial water treatment plant in the city, but since May 2011, the waters have been allowed to empty into the Kumpulanpuro. Occasionally contaminated water will overflow into nearby areas such as the Vallila allotment garden, causing problems.

The construction of an urban runoff park in the Isonniitty Park area in Kumpula has begun, and the former “recreational and playground grass is just a memory now”. The permission for this work was applied for by the Finnish Transport Agency and the State Railways. The permission was granted by the Regional State Administrative Agency for Southern Finland.
