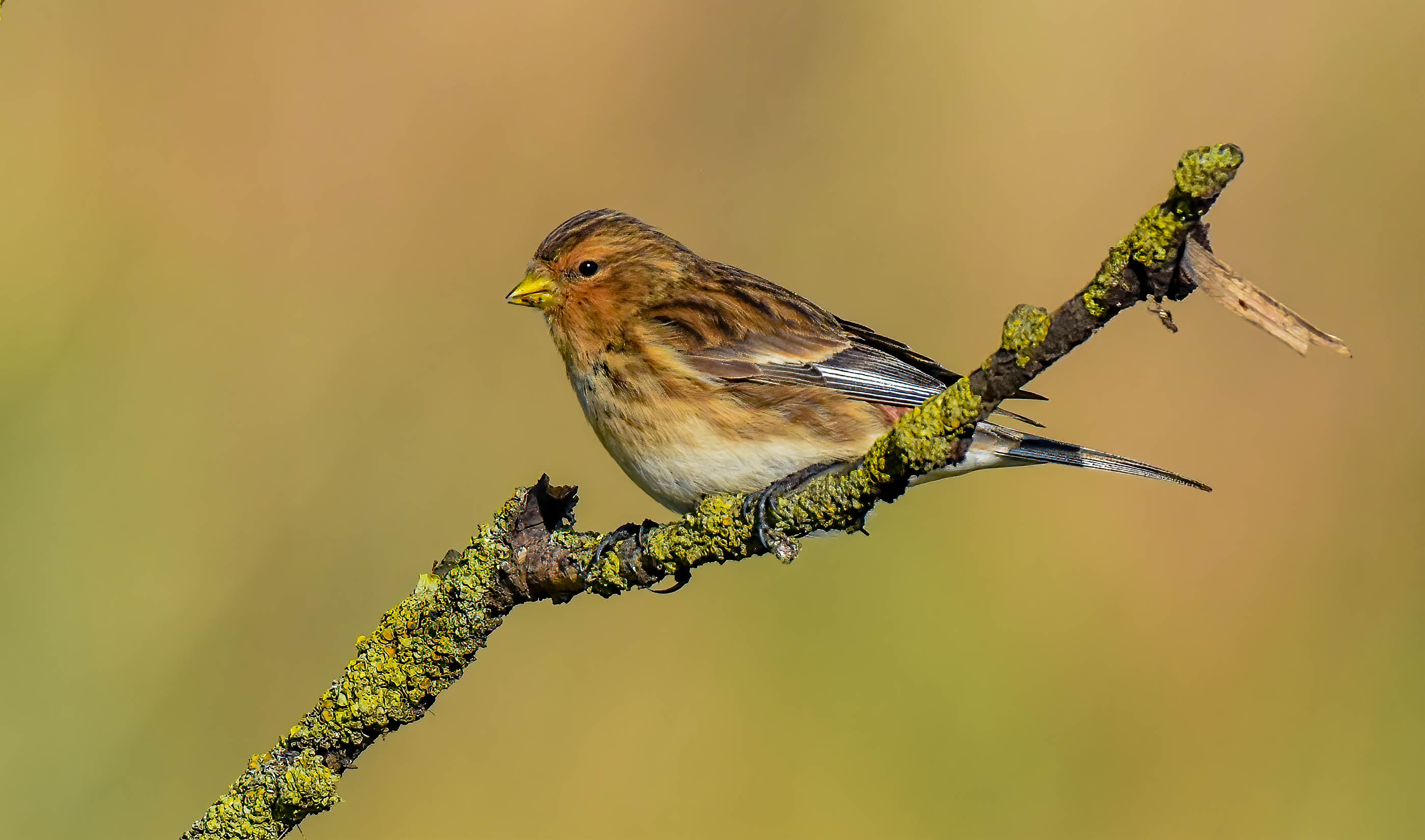
- L. f. pipilans, Hartlepool, England

Conservation status
- Least Concern (IUCN 3.1)

Scientific classification
- Kingdom: Animalia
- Phylum: Chordata
- Class: Aves
- Order: Passeriformes
- Family: Fringillidae
- Subfamily: Carduelinae
- Genus: Linaria
- Species: L. flavirostris

Binomial name
- Linaria flavirostris (Linnaeus, 1758)

Subspecies
- See text
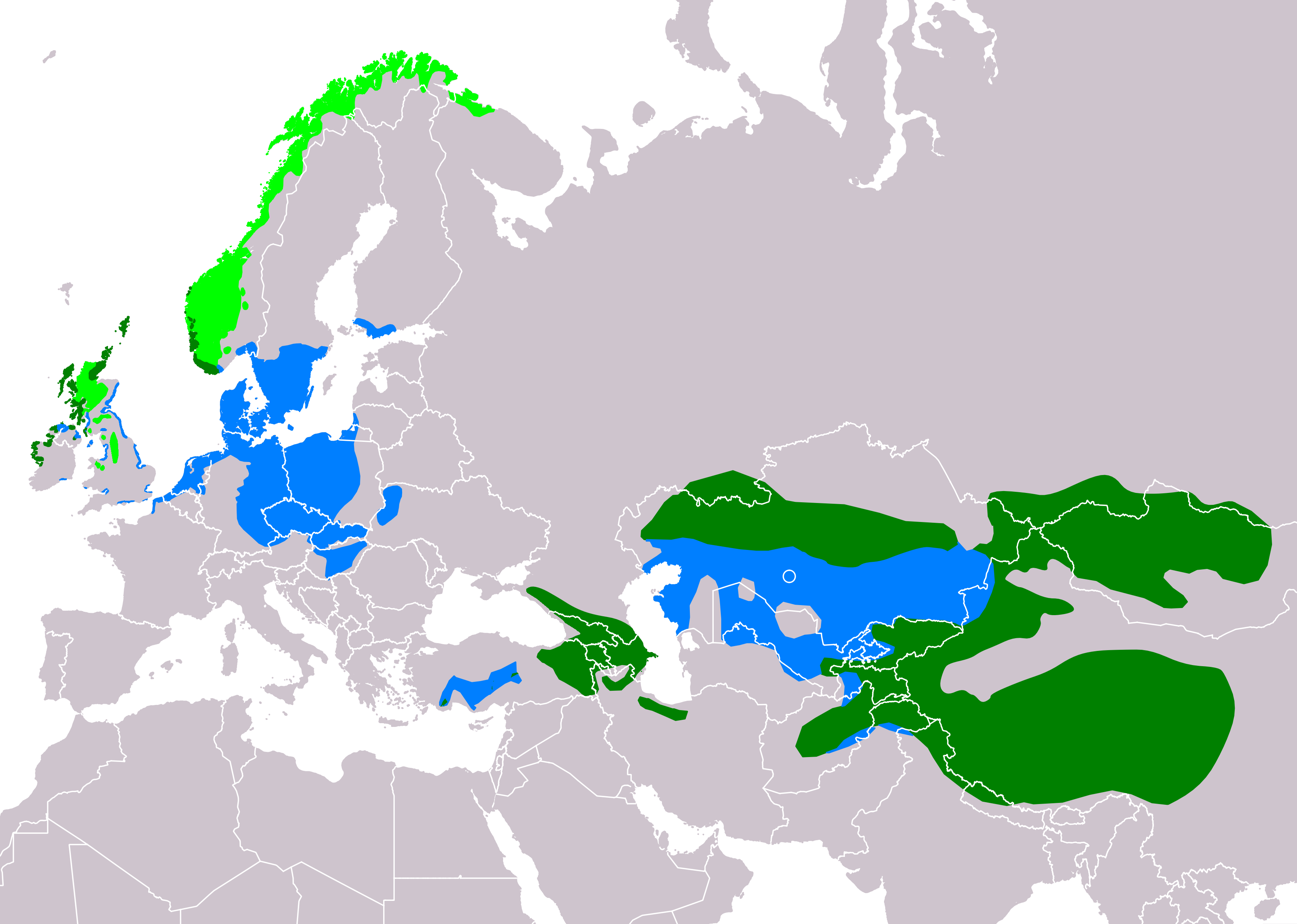
- Range of L. flavirostris Breeding summer visitor Breeding resident Non-breeding

Synonyms
- Fringilla flavirostris Linnaeus, 1758; Carduelis flavirostris (Linnaeus, 1758); Acanthis flavirostris (Linnaeus, 1758)

= Twite =

Species of bird

The twite (Linaria flavirostris) is a small brown passerine bird in the finch family Fringillidae. It is a partially migratory species that is found in a strongly disjunct distribution in northern Europe, and in Asian mountains from eastern Turkey to Nepal, western China and Mongolia. It mainly feeds on small seeds but occasionally also feeds on insects.

== Taxonomy ==
In 1758 the Swedish naturalist Carl Linnaeus included the twite in the 10th edition of his Systema Naturae under the binomial name Fringilla flavirostris. The twite and the closely related linnets were at one time placed in the genus Carduelis but were moved to the resurrected genus Linaria based on a phylogenetic analysis of mitochondrial and nuclear DNA sequences that was published in 2012. The genus had originally been described in 1802 by the German naturalist Johann Matthäus Bechstein. The genus name linaria is the Latin for a linen-weaver, from linum, "flax". The specific epithet flavirostris means "yellow-billed".

Nine subspecies are recognised:

- L. f. pipilans (Latham, 1787) – north Ireland and north Britain (syn. L. f. bensonorum)
- L. f. flavirostris (Linnaeus, 1758) – north Scandinavia and northwest Russia
- L. f. brevirostris (Bonaparte, 1855) – Turkey, the Caucasus and north Iran
- L. f. kirghizorum (Sushkin, 1925) – north, central Kazakhstan
- L. f. korejevi (Zarudny & Härms, 1914) – northeast Kazakhstan to northwest China
- L. f. altaica (Sushkin, 1925) – southwest Siberia and north, west Mongolia
- L. f. montanella (Hume, 1873) – Kyrgyzstan, Tajikistan, north Afghanistan and northwest Pakistan to northwest China (syn. L. f. pamirensis)
- L. f. miniakensis (Jacobi, A, 1923) – east Tibet and west China
- L. f. rufostrigata (Walton, 1905) – west, south Tibet, north India and north Nepal

== Description ==
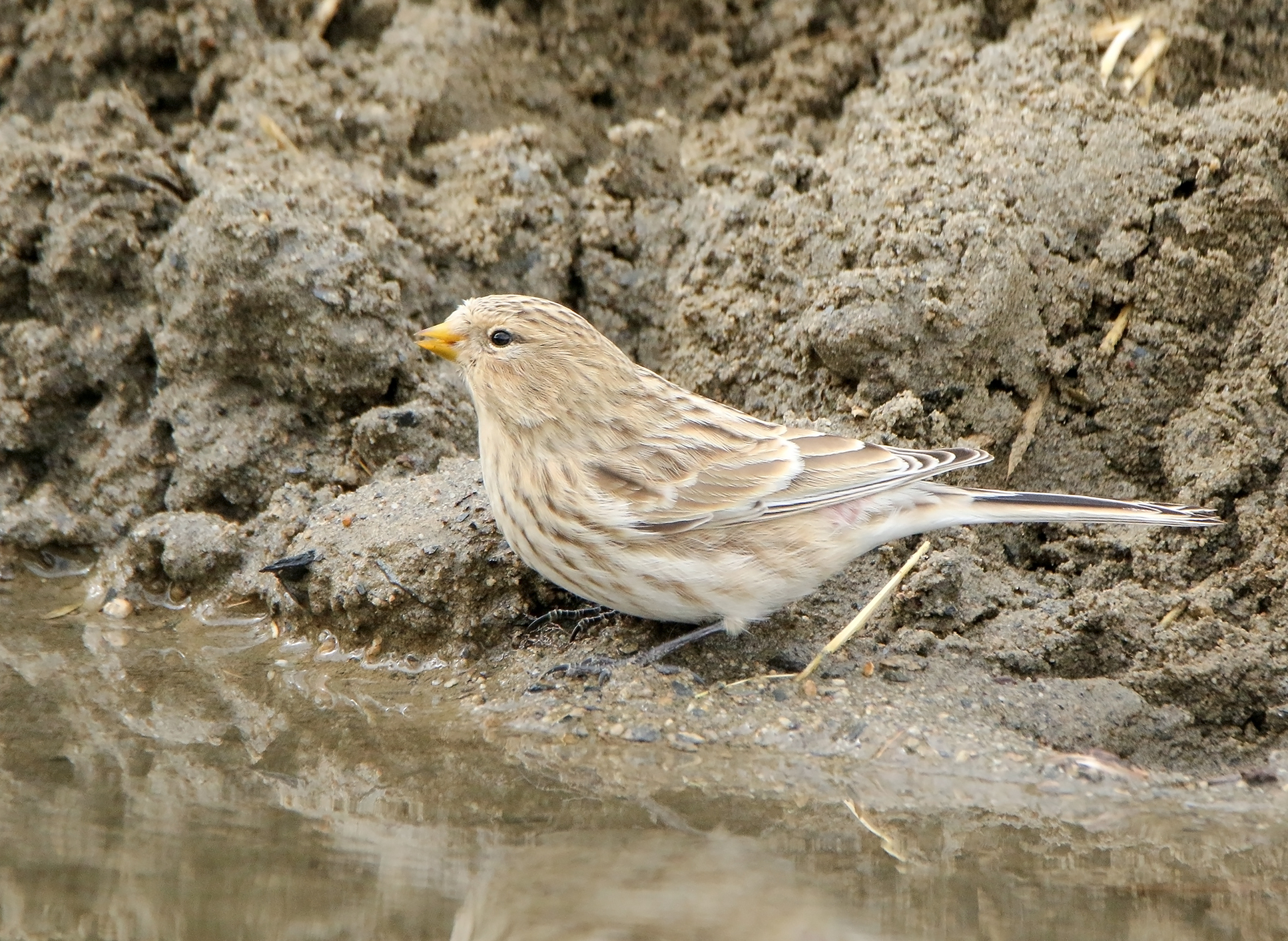
The pale subspecies L. f. montanella in northern Pakistan

The twite is similar in size and shape to a linnet, at 13 to 13.5 cm (5.1 to 5.3 in) long. It lacks the red head patch and breast shown by the linnet and the redpolls. It is brown streaked with black above; adult males also have a pink rump, immatures and females a brown rump. The underparts are buff to whitish, streaked with brown. The conical bill is yellow in winter and grey in summer. The call is a very distinctive nasal twaa-it, from which its name derives, and the song contains fast trills and twitters. Twite often form large flocks outside the breeding season, sometimes mixed with other finches on coasts and salt marshes. They feed mainly on seeds.

The subspecies vary in plumage tone, with L. f. pipilans of the hyper-humid oceanic climate of Britain and Ireland the darkest (following Gloger's rule) and nominate L. f. flavirostris in Scandinavia the next darkest. The Asian subspecies, found in much drier mountain habitats, are much paler.

== Distribution and habitat ==
The twite breeds in northern Europe and across the Palearctic to Siberia and China. Alpine grassland and low shrubland is favoured for breeding; in the Asian part of its range, it breeds at high to very high altitudes, from 3,600–4,900 m, but in the much cooler oceanic climate summers of northwestern Europe, it breeds much lower, and down to sea level in northwestern Ireland, western and northern Scotland, and Norway; here it is strongly associated with traditional low-intensity farming on coastal machair grassland.

It is partially resident and in winter many birds migrate further south, or move to the coasts. It has declined sharply in parts of its range, notably in Ireland.

== Behaviour ==
=== Breeding ===
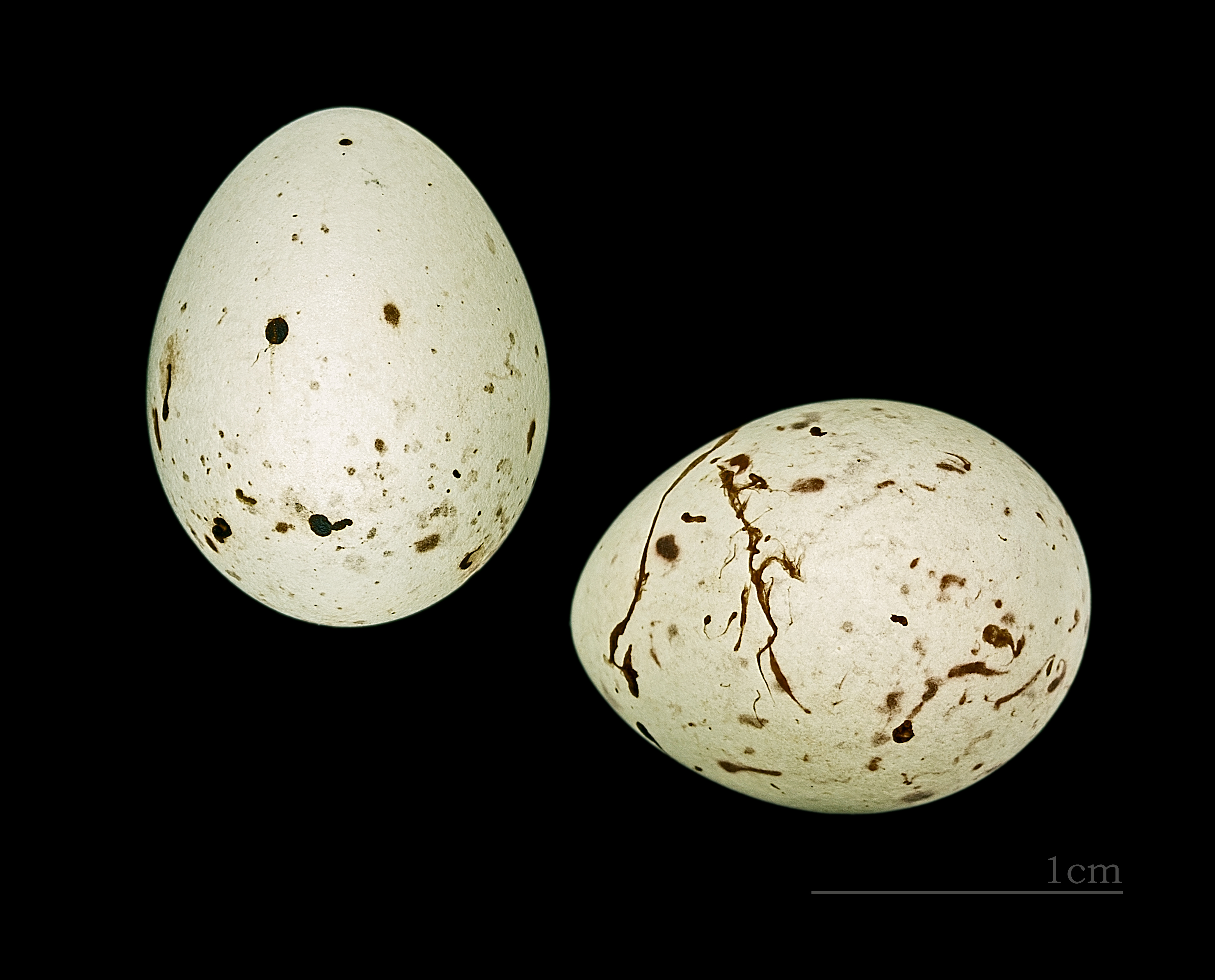
Twite eggs

The female builds a nest either on the ground or low down in a bush, laying 3–6 eggs. The eggs are light or dark blue in colour with variable dark purplish-brown specs or blotches which are mainly concentrated around the broad end. They are laid daily and measure 17.4 mm × 13.2 mm (0.69 in × 0.52 in). They are incubated by the female for 12–13 days. The young are fed and cared for by both parents and fledge when aged 11 to 12 days. They continue to be fed for a further two weeks after leaving the nest.

In the UK, the twite is the subject of several research projects in the Pennines, the Scottish Highlands and on the North Wales and Lancashire coastlines. Records show that the birds to the east of the Pennine hills move to the southeast coast in winter and those to the west winter between Lancashire and the Hebrides. The Welsh population winters almost exclusively in Flintshire. Ringing data has revealed that twite breeding in different parts of Britain use different non‐breeding areas, and that non-breeding areas of British twite do not overlap with non-breeding areas of continental twite.
