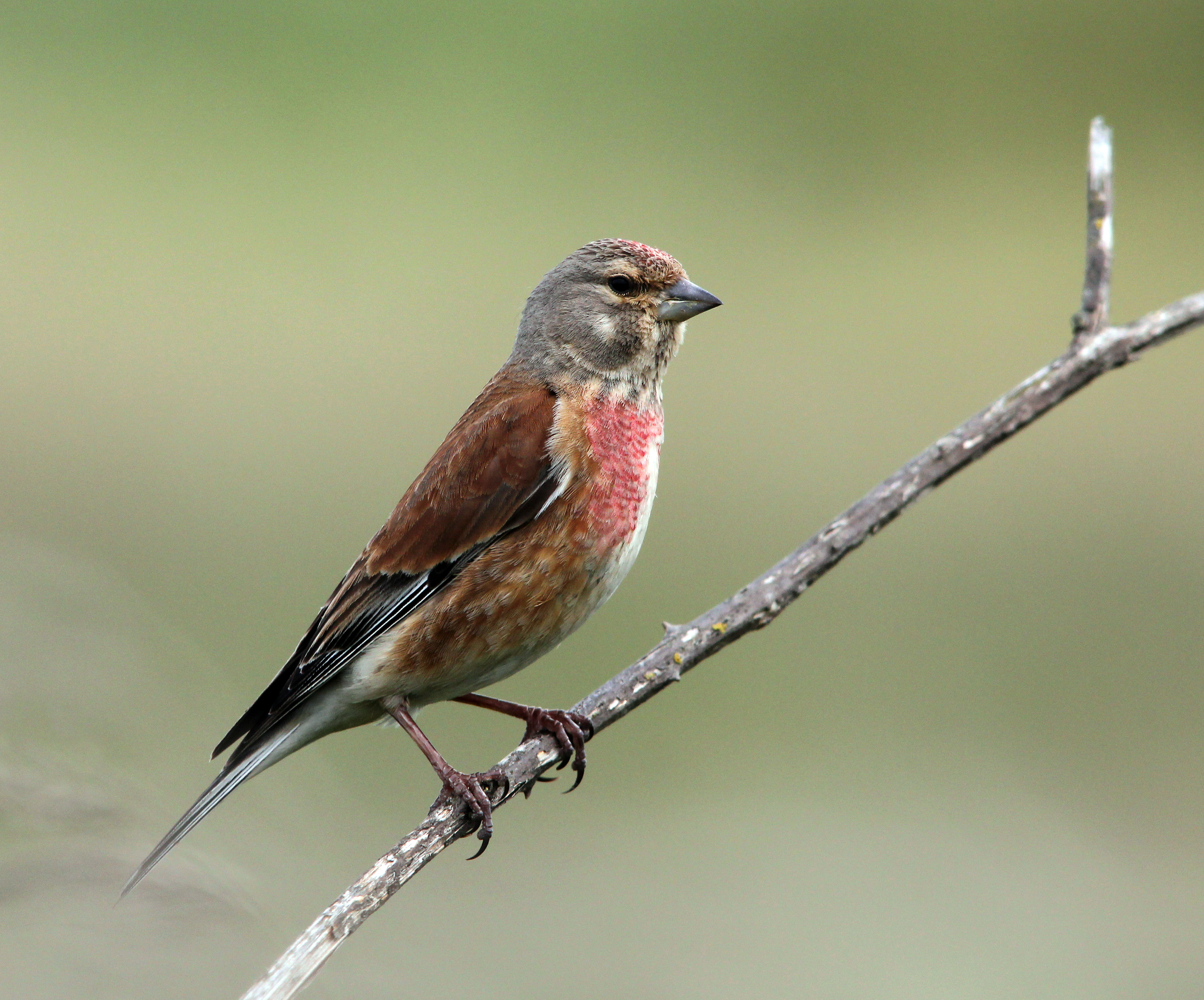
- Male in breeding plumage
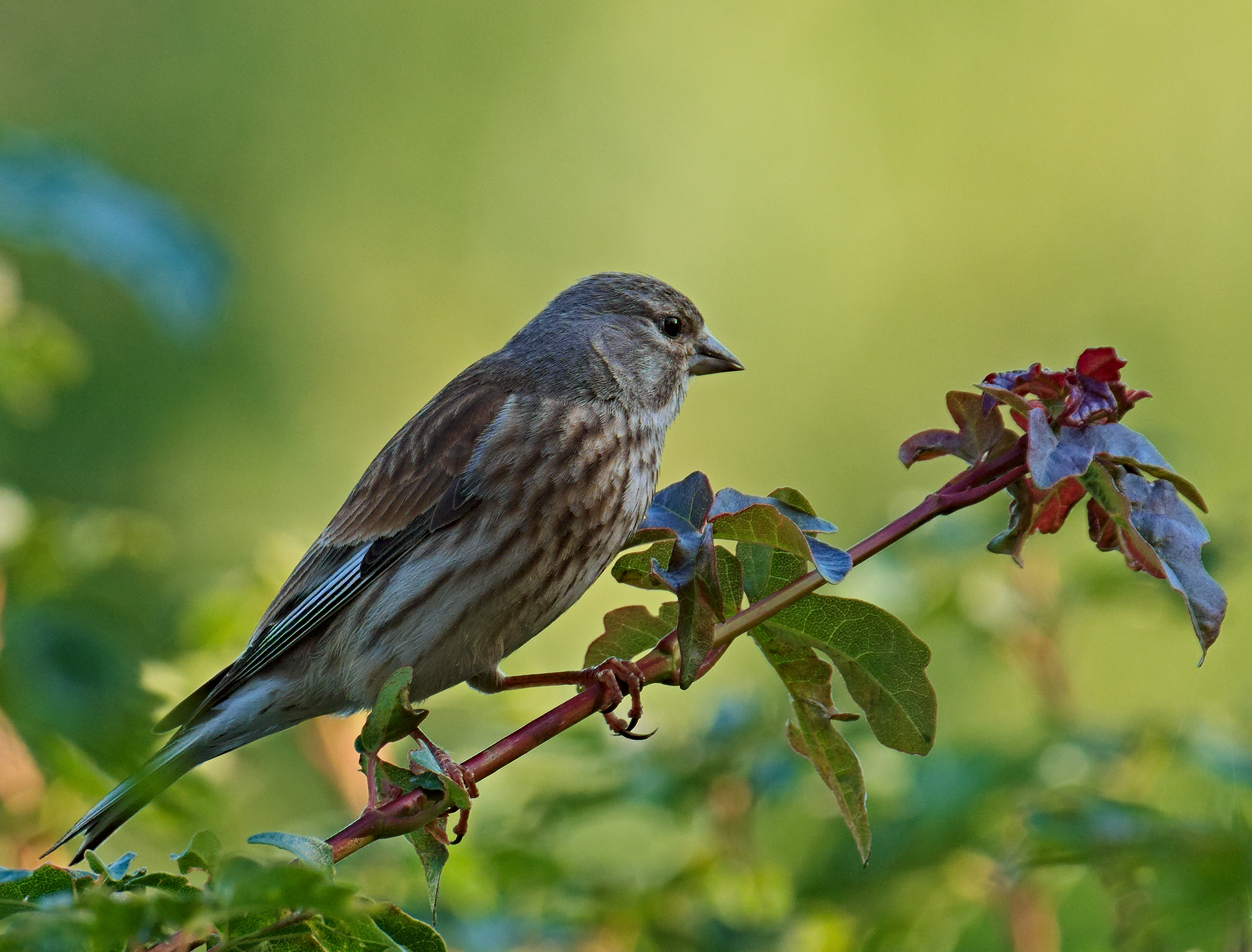
- Female Song

Conservation status
- Least Concern (IUCN 3.1)

Scientific classification
- Kingdom: Animalia
- Phylum: Chordata
- Class: Aves
- Order: Passeriformes
- Family: Fringillidae
- Subfamily: Carduelinae
- Genus: Linaria
- Species: L. cannabina

Binomial name
- Linaria cannabina (Linnaeus, 1758)
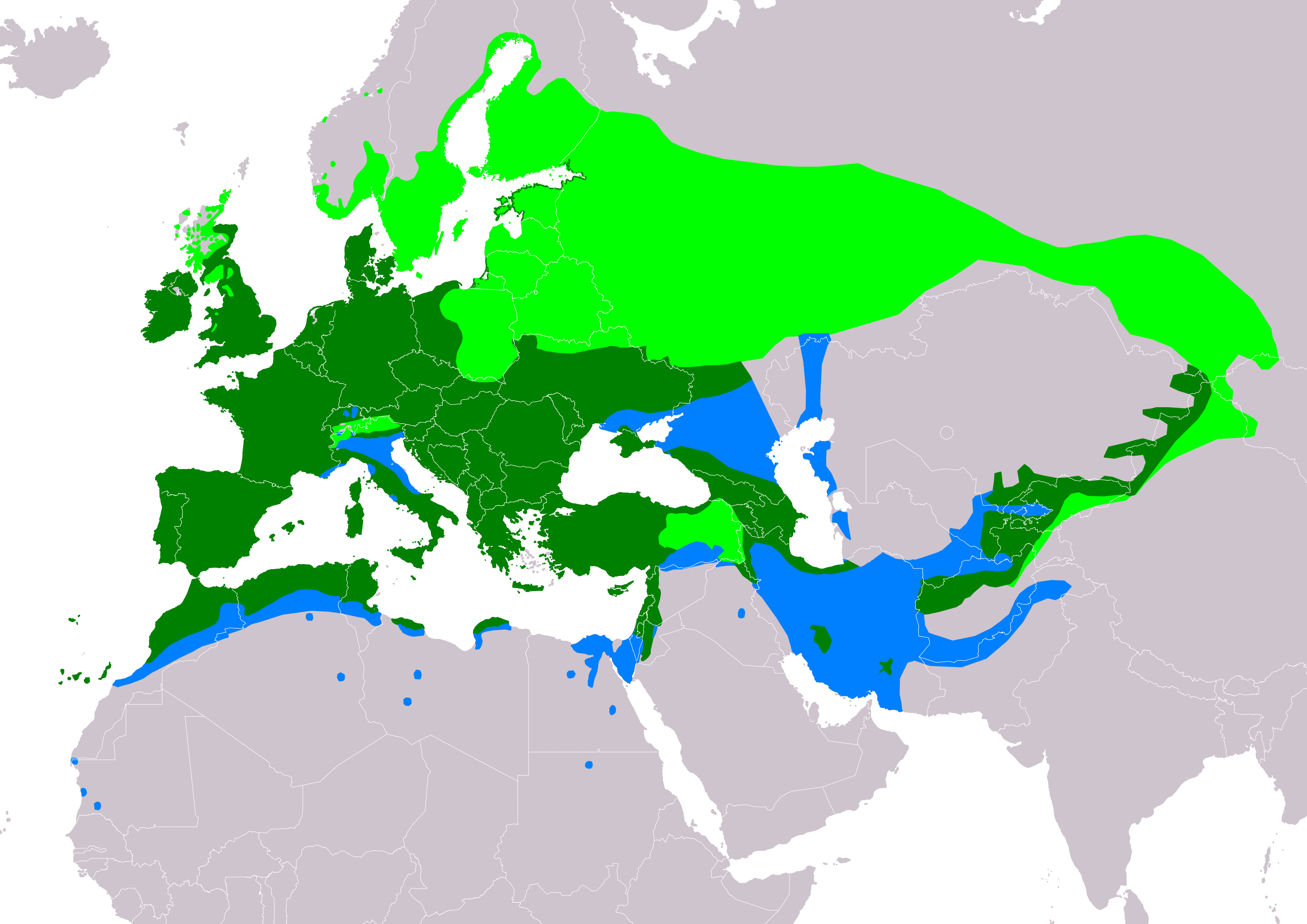
- Range of L. cannabina Breeding Resident Non-breeding

Synonyms
- Fringilla cannabina Linnaeus, 1758; Carduelis cannabina (Linnaeus, 1758)

= Common linnet =

Species of bird

The common linnet or Eurasian linnet (Linaria cannabina) is a small passerine bird of the finch family, Fringillidae. It derives its common name and the scientific name, Linaria, from its fondness for hemp seeds and flax seeds—flax being the English name of the plant from which linen is made.

== Taxonomy ==
In 1758, the Swedish naturalist Carl Linnaeus included the common linnet in the 10th edition of his Systema Naturae under the binomial name, Acanthis cannabina. The species was formerly placed in the genus Carduelis but based on the results of a phylogenetic analysis of mitochondrial and nuclear DNA sequences published in 2012, it was moved to the genus Linaria that had been introduced by the German naturalist Johann Matthäus Bechstein in 1802.

The genus name linaria is the Latin for a linen-weaver, from linum, "flax". The species name cannabina comes from the Latin for hemp. The English name has a similar root, being derived from Old French linette, from lin, "flax".

There are seven recognised subspecies:

- L. c. autochthona (Clancey, 1946) – Scotland
- L. c. cannabina (Linnaeus, 1758) – western, central and northern Europe, western and central Siberia. Non-breeding in north Africa and southwest Asia
- L. c. bella (Brehm, CL, 1845) – Middle East to Mongolia and northwestern China
- L. c. mediterranea (Tschusi, 1903) – Iberian Peninsula, Italy, Greece, northwest Africa and Mediterranean islands
- L. c. guentheri (Wolters, 1953) – Madeira
- L. c. meadewaldoi (Hartert, 1901) – western and central Canary Island (El Hierro and Gran Canaria)
- L. c. harterti (Bannerman, 1913) – eastern Canary Islands (Alegranza, Lanzarote and Fuerteventura)
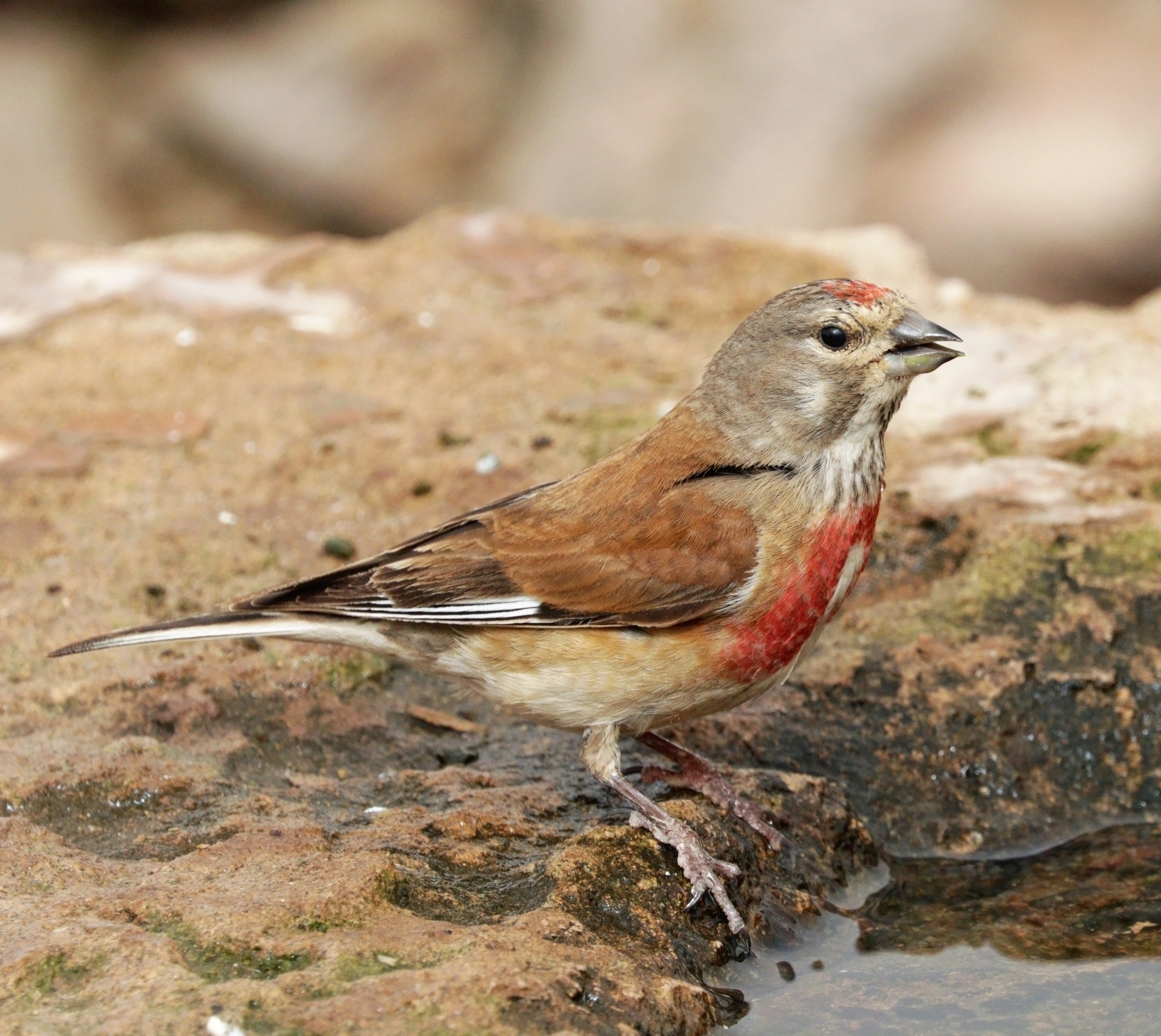
L. c. mediterranea, male

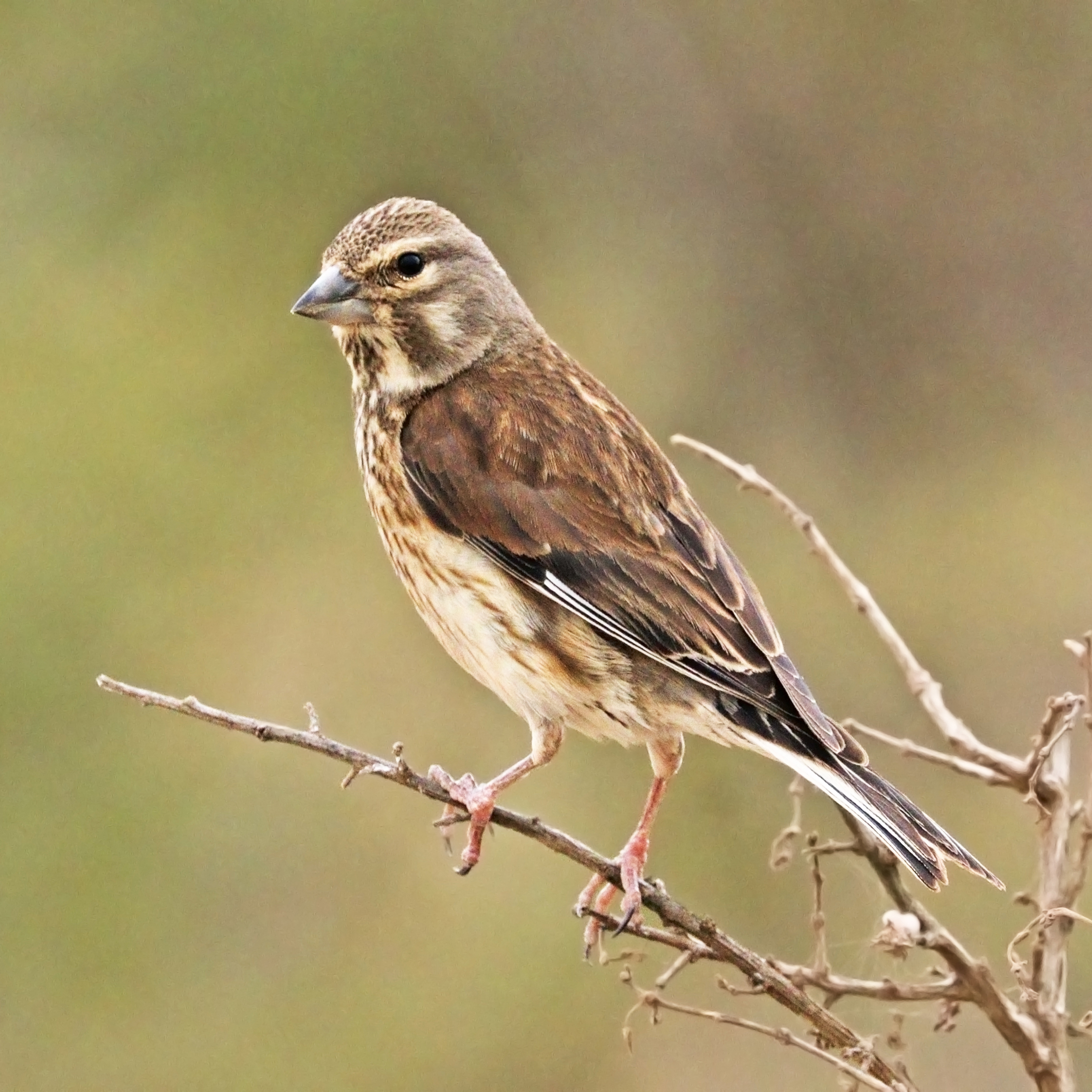
L. c. mediterranea, female

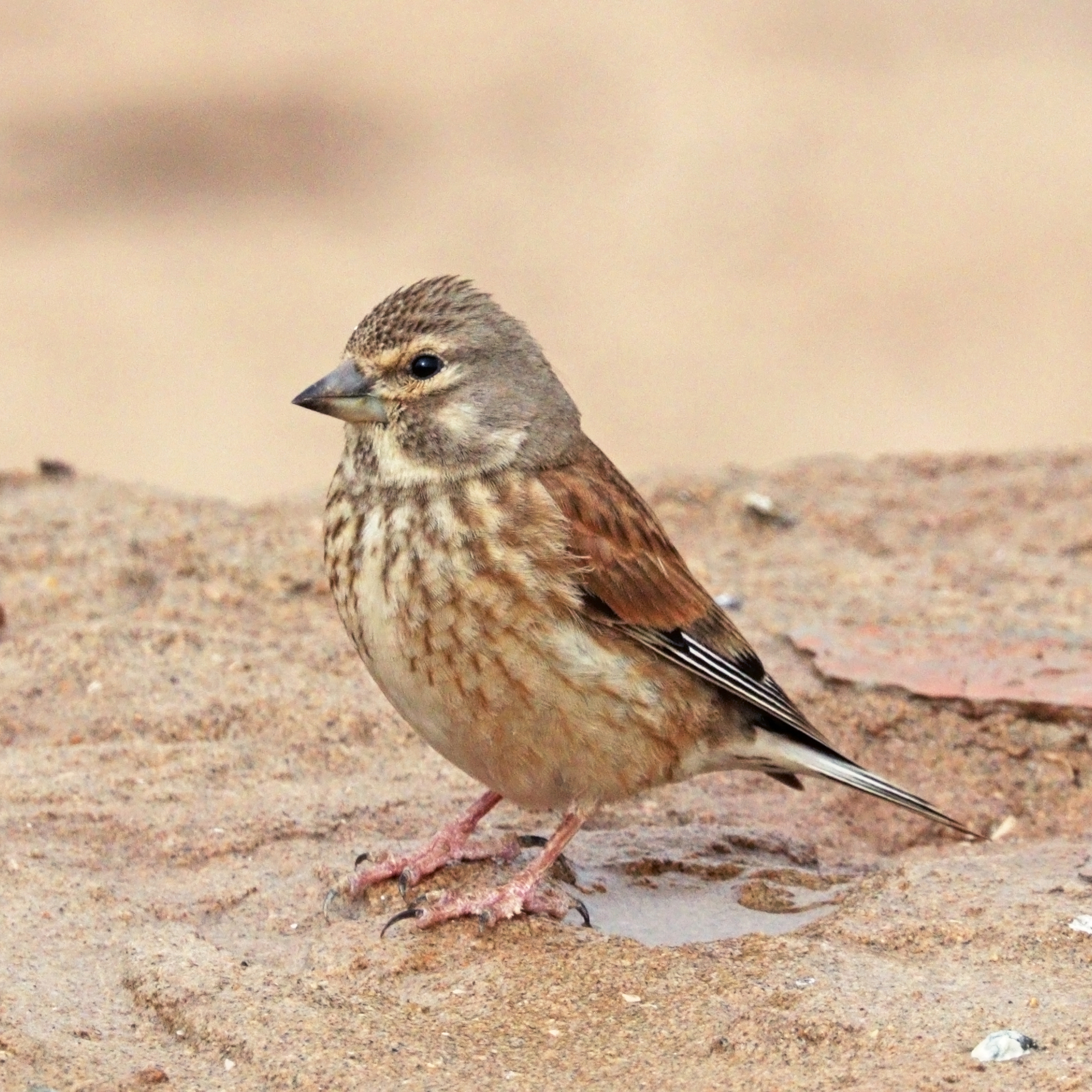
L. c. mediterranea, juvenile

== Description ==
The common linnet is a slim bird with a long tail. The upper parts are brown, the throat is sullied white and the bill is grey. The summer male has a grey nape, red head-patch and red breast. Females and young birds lack the red and have white underparts, the breast streaked buff.

== Distribution ==
The common linnet breeds in Europe, the western Palearctic and North Africa. It is partially resident, but many eastern and northern birds migrate farther south in the breeding range or move to the coasts. They are sometimes found several hundred miles off-shore. It has been introduced to the Dominican Republic.

== Behaviour ==
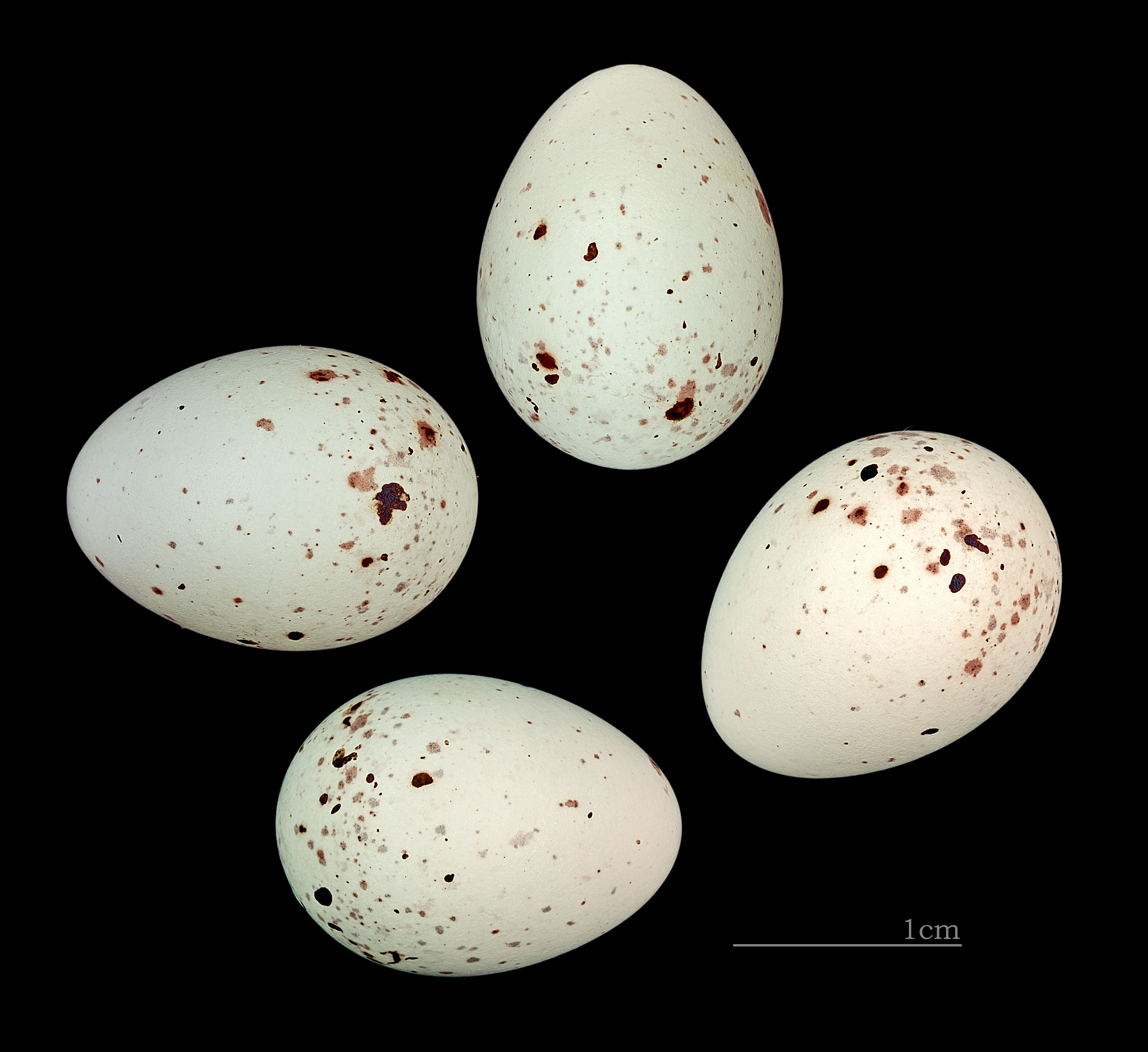
Eggs

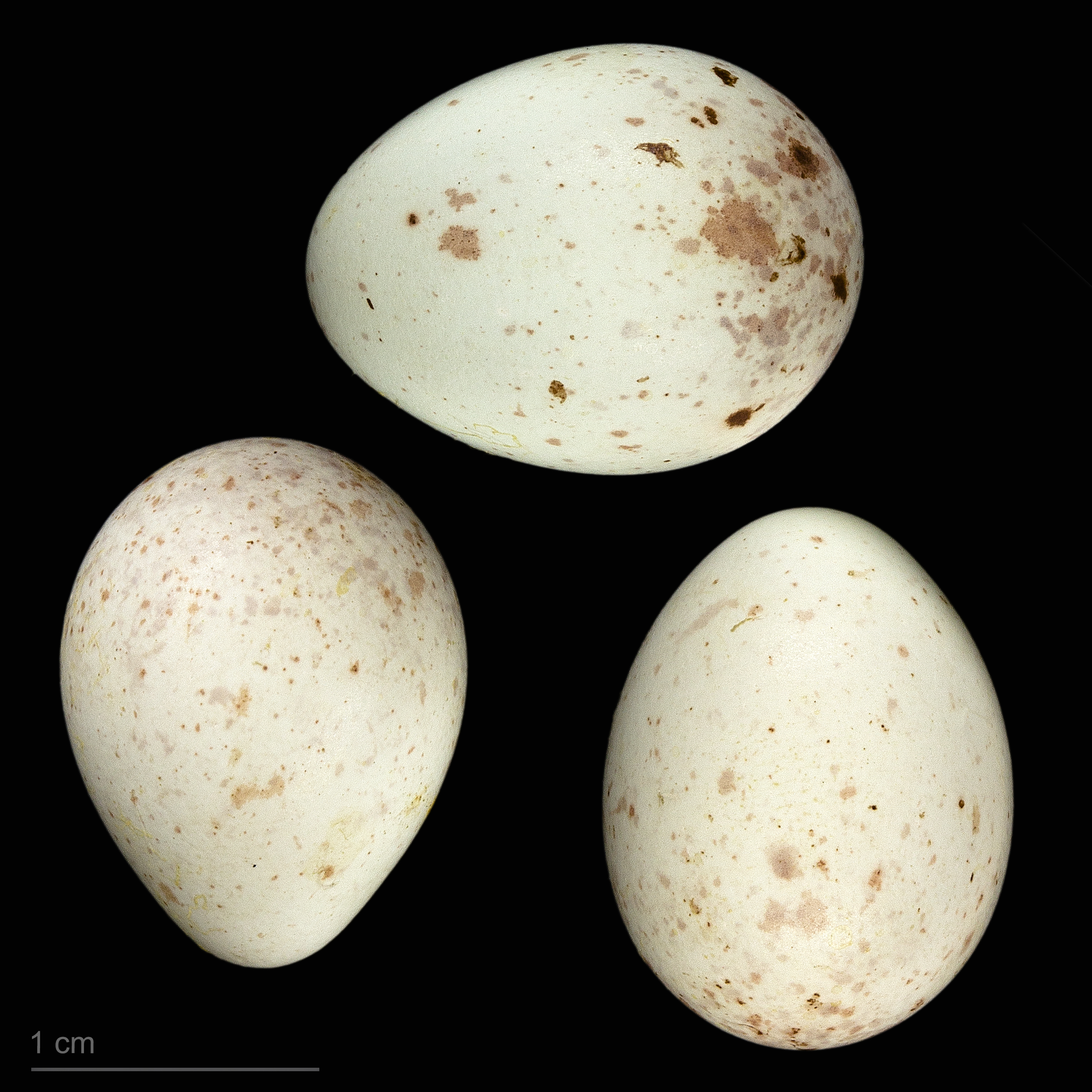
Linaria cannabina mediterranea - MHNT

Open land with thick bushes is favoured for breeding, including heathland and garden. It builds its nest in a bush, laying four to seven eggs.

This species can form large flocks outside the breeding season, sometimes mixed with other finches, such as twite, on coasts and salt marshes.

The common linnet's pleasant song contains fast trills and twitters.

It feeds on the ground, and low down in bushes, its food mainly consisting of seeds, which it also feeds to its chicks. It likes small to medium-sized seeds from most arable weeds, knotgrass, dock, crucifers (including charlock, shepherd's purse), chickweeds, dandelions, thistle, sow-thistle, mayweed, common groundsel, common hawthorn and birch. They have a small component of Invertebrates in their diet.

== Conservation ==
The common linnet is listed by the UK Biodiversity Action Plan as a priority species. It is protected in the UK by the Wildlife and Countryside Act 1981.

In Britain, populations are declining, attributed to increasing use of herbicides, aggressive scrub removal and excessive hedge trimming; its population fell by 56% between 1968 and 1991, probably due to a decrease in seed supply and the increasing use of herbicide. From 1980 to 2009, according to the Pan-European Common Bird Monitoring Scheme, the European population decreased by 62%

Favourable management practices on agricultural land include:

- Set-aside
- Overwinter stubbles
- Uncultivated margins, ditches, field corners
- Conservation headlands
- Wild bird cover, using plants that produce small, oil-rich seeds, such as kale, quinoa, mustard plant and oil-seed rape Brassica napus
- Restoration of meadows: restoration and creation of hay-meadows
- Short, thick, thorny hedgerows and scrub for nesting habitat

== Cultural references ==
The bird was a popular pet in the late Victorian and Edwardian eras. Alfred, Lord Tennyson mentions "the linnet born within the cage" in Canto 27 of his 1849 poem "In Memoriam A.H.H.", the same section that contains the famous lines "'Tis better to have loved and lost / Than never to have loved at all." A linnet features in the classic British music hall song "Don't Dilly Dally on the Way" (1919) which is subtitled "The Cock Linnet Song". It is a character in Oscar Wilde's children's story "The Devoted Friend" (1888) and Wilde also mentions how the call of the linnet awakens "The Selfish Giant" to the one tree where it is springtime in his garden. William Butler Yeats evokes the image of the common linnet in "The Lake Isle of Innisfree" (1890) : "And evening full of the linnet's wings." and also mentions the bird in his poem "A Prayer for My Daughter" (1919): "May she become a flourishing hidden tree That all her thoughts may like the linnet be, And have no business but dispensing round Their magnanimities of sound." In the 1840 novel The Old Curiosity Shop by Charles Dickens, the heroine Nell keeps "only a poor linnet" in a cage, which she leaves for Kit as a sign of her gratefulness to him.

The English Baroque composer John Blow composed an ode on the occasion of the death of his colleague Henry Purcell, "An Ode on the Death of Mr. Purcell" set to the poem "Mark how the lark and linnet sing" by the poet John Dryden.

"The Linnets" has become the nickname of King's Lynn Football Club, Burscough Football Club and Runcorn Linnets Football Club (formerly known as 'Runcorn F.C.' and Runcorn F.C. Halton). Barry Town F.C., the South Wales-based football team, also used to be nicknamed 'The Linnets'.

Robert Burns's 1788 poem "A Mother's Lament for the Death of Her Son" also tells of a linnet bird bewailing her ravished young.

William Blake invokes "the linnet's song" in one of the poems entitled "Song" in his Poetical Sketches.

Walter de la Mare's poem "The Linnet", published in 1918 in the collection Motley and Other Poems, has been set to music by a number of composers including Cecil Armstrong Gibbs, Kenneth Leighton and Jack Gibbons.

The Eurovision Song Contest 2014 entry for the Netherlands "The Common Linnets" is a direct reference to the bird.

William Wordsworth argued that the song of the common linnet provides more wisdom than books in the third verse of "The Tables Turned":

Books! 'tis a dull and endless strife:
Come, hear the woodland linnet,
How sweet his music! on my life,
There's more of wisdom in it.

But the fellow English poet Robert Bridges used the common linnet instead to express the limitations of poetry—concentrating on the difficulty in poetry of conveying the beauty of a bird's song. He wrote in the first verse:

I heard a linnet courting
His lady in the spring:
His mates were idly sporting,
Nor stayed to hear him sing
His song of love.—
I fear my speech distorting
His tender love.

The musical Sweeney Todd features the song "Green Finch and Linnet Bird", in which a young lady confined to her room wonders why caged birds sing:

Green finch and linnet bird,
Nightingale, blackbird,
How is it you sing?
How can you jubilate,
Sitting in cages,
Never taking wing?

In Emily Dickinson's poem "Morns like these—we parted—" the last line is: "And this linnet flew!"

== Gallery ==
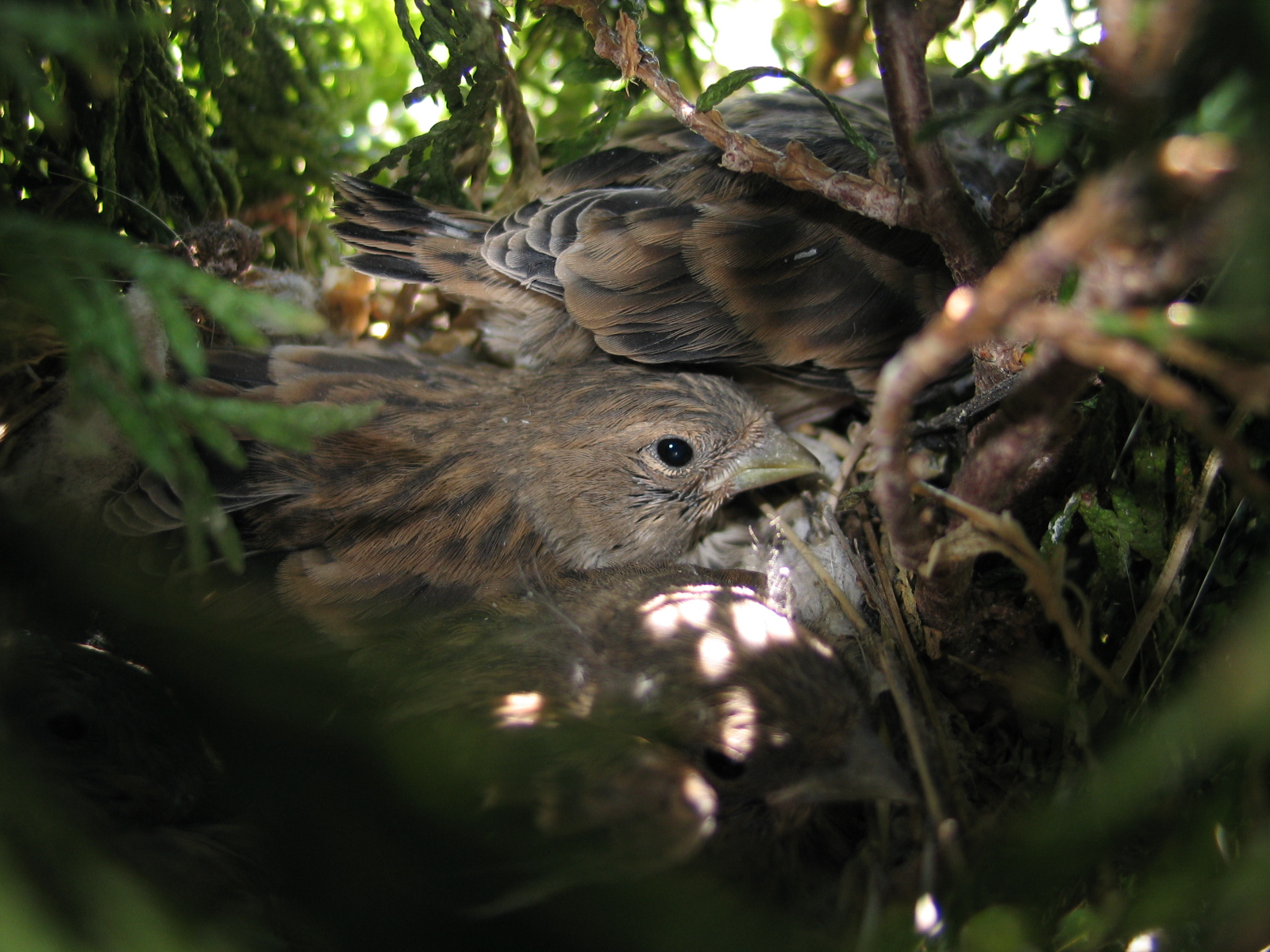
Young in nest

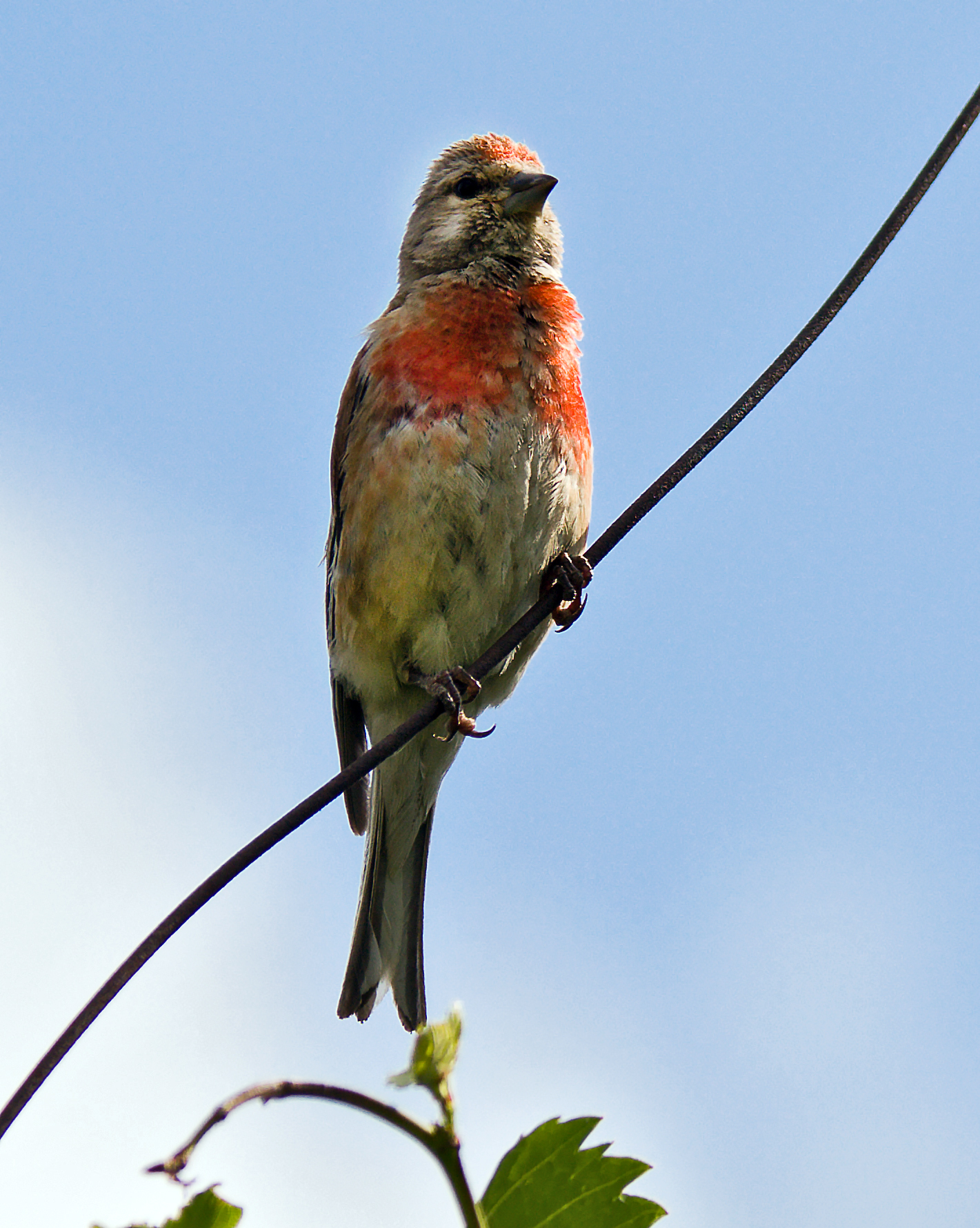

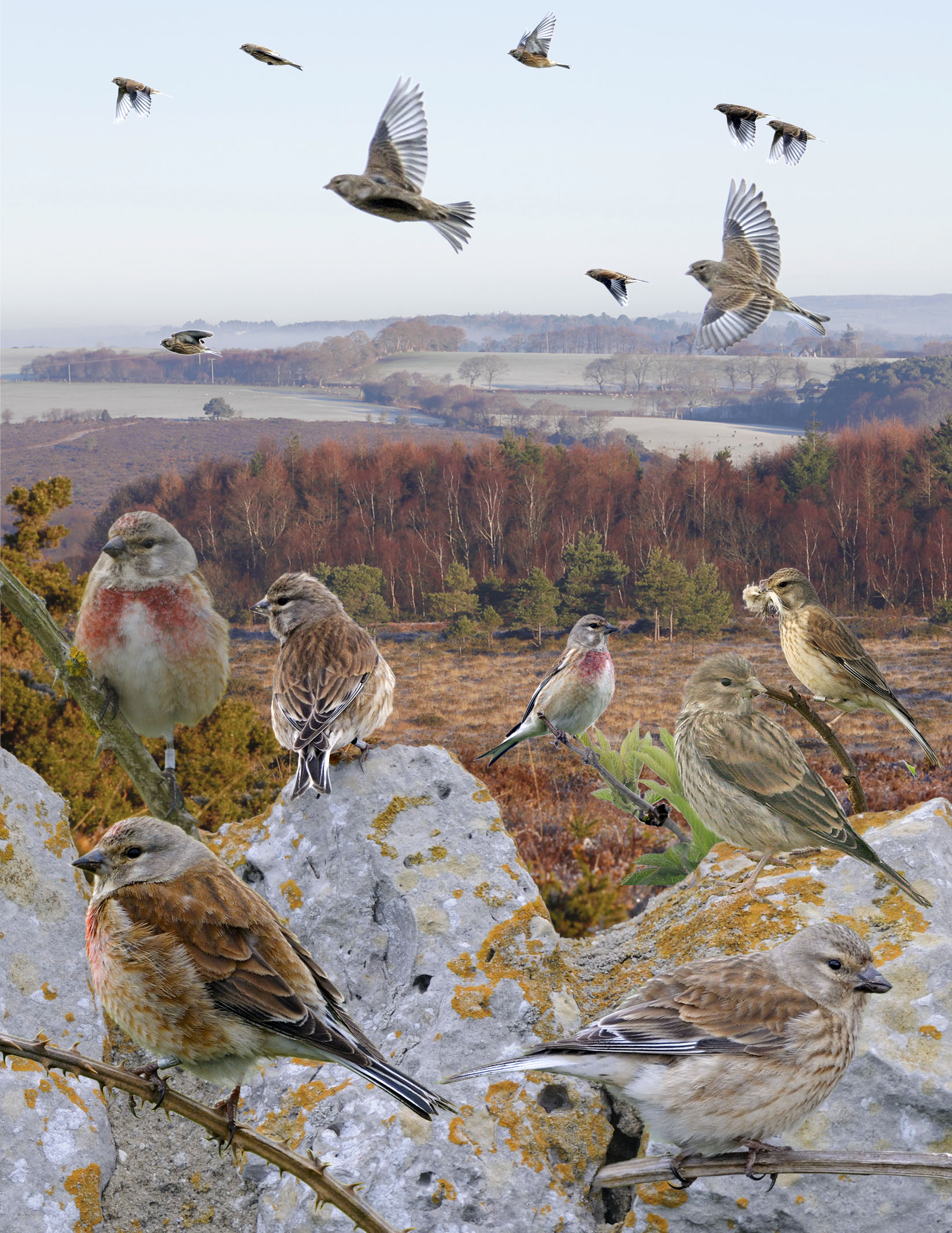
ID composite
