= Handöls quarry =

- Location in Sweden
- Location: Åre, Jämtland County, Sweden; 63°14′52″N 12°28′28.88″E
- Products: Soapstone

Handöls quarry (Swedish: Handöls stenbrott) is a soapstone quarry in Sweden near the Norwegian border. The composition of the soapstone has been estimated at 72% talc, 16% chlorite, 5.5% magnetite, 5% amphibole (chiefly tremolite and actinolite) and 1.5% carbonate.
