= Horokanai Ophiolite =

Geologic formation in Japan

The Horokanai ophiolite is a geological complex located in the Kamuikotan tectonic belt about 30 km northwest of Asahikawa city, Hokkaido, Japan. The ophiolite complex is exposed along either side of a north-dipping anticline in several blocks.

== Stratigraphy ==
Exact thicknesses of units within the Horokanai Ophiolite complex are not reliably estimable due to differences in stratigraphy and structure between different blocks. However, the basic sequence of units within the complex as a whole has been described in several studies.

Overlying, unconformable Cretaceous sediments

- Radiolarian chert, shales, sandstones

Gabbroic – Basaltic Rocks (intruded by dolerite and plagio-granite dikes)

- Metamorphosed basalts exhibiting pillow lava and basaltic tuff flow structures
  - Uppermost portion is the Gokurakudaira Formation: a Type-1-aphyric tholeiite greenstone belt
- Amphibolites derived from basaltic and gabbroic rocks
- Metamorphosed massive-gabbro- and layered-gabbro-derived amphibolites

Ultra-Mafic Rocks (intruded by dikes and lenses of diorite rocks, olivine gabbro, and hornblende-gabbro pegmatite)

- Orthopyroxenite with layered, cumulate structures
- Serpentinite with relict mineral structures suggesting parental dunite with layered/cumulate structures
- Serpentinite with relict mineral structures suggesting parental harzburgite (described as massive, homogeneous with thin dunite layers)

Underlying layer of Kamuikotan tectonic belt blueschist

== Metamorphism ==
The Horokanai ophiolite exhibits metamorphism of the low greenschist (upper Horokanai ophiolite) to low granulite (lower Horokanai ophiolite) facies. Asahina et al. (1979) describes the metamorphic alteration of the complex. The original dunite and harzburgite of the ultra-mafic lower portion of the ophiolite have largely been metamorphosed into serpentinite, with little to none of the original peridotite remaining. The orthopyroxenite is described as “Metagabbro.” What was originally a coarse-to-fine gabbro section is now a sequence of clinopyroxene-, schistose- and epidote-amphibolites. Finally, the upper basaltic pillow lavas and tuff flows have metamorphosed to amphibolite schists and “metabasalt.”

Asahina et al. (1979) presents two theories for the metamorphism of the Horokanai complex. The first theory claims that metamorphism takes place at a mid-ocean ridge with a high geothermal gradient, accompanied by shear and plastic flow. The second theory claims that metamorphism takes place within an island-arc complex, where the rocks making up the ophiolite serve as basement rocks.

== Origins ==
Ishizuka (1981) proposes an abyssal tholeiitic composition for the Horokanai ophiolite complex, claiming that the chemical composition of the ophiolite more closely resembles that of an oceanic spreading ridge than that of an island arc or hotspot. The distinction was made by examining the Chromium, Nickel and Titanium abundances in the ophiolite, as well as relic spinel chemistry in Horokanai pillow basalts.

Takashima et al. (2002) examines the Gokurakudaira Formation - the uppermost mafic portion of the Horokanai ophiolite - in order to determine an origin. The formation exhibits MORB-like tholeiitic composition in agreement with the observations from Ishizuka. However, Takashima et al. (2002) presents other petrologic evidence that suggests a geologic fore-arc setting similar to the Lau Basin. They base this conclusion on the presence of picrite (with back-arc-associated pyroclastic and turbidite deposits) and high-Mg basaltic-andesite (commonly associated with fore-arc and back-arc settings) within the Gokurakudaira Formation. In their model, the formation of a spreading center within a fore-arc basin above a subducting plate constitutes the origin of the Horokanai ophiolite complex.
