= Ophiolite =

Uplifted and exposed oceanic crust

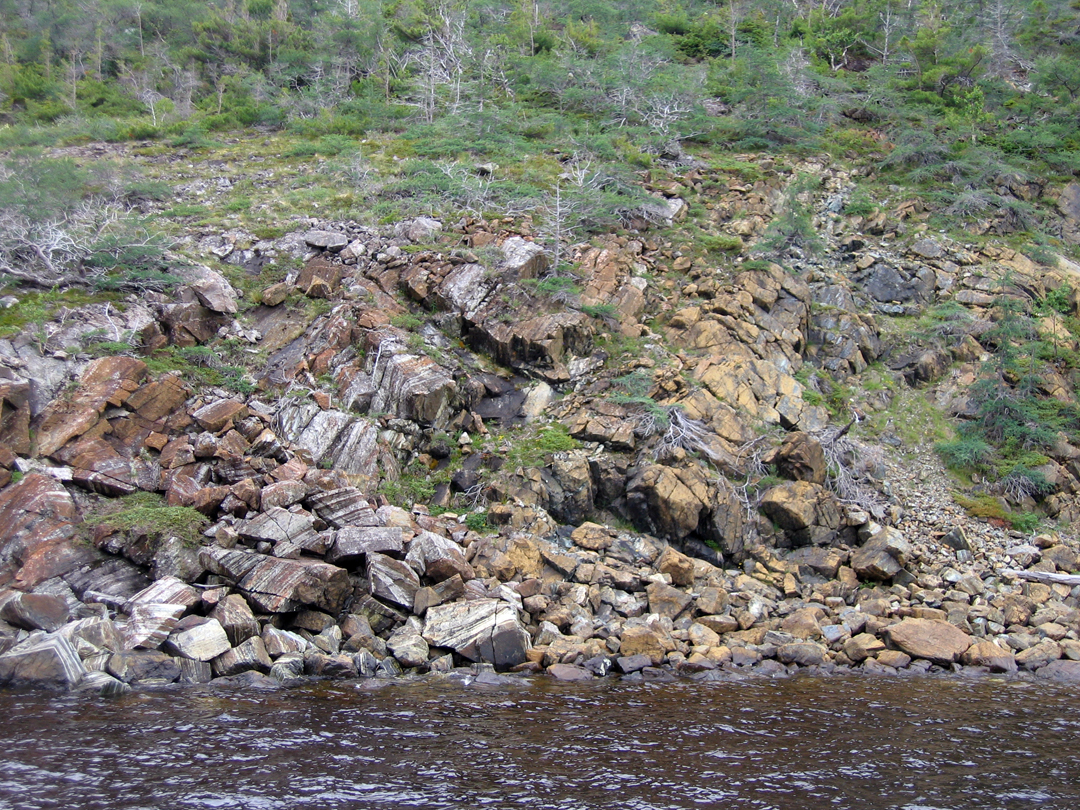
Ordovician ophiolite in Gros Morne National Park, Newfoundland

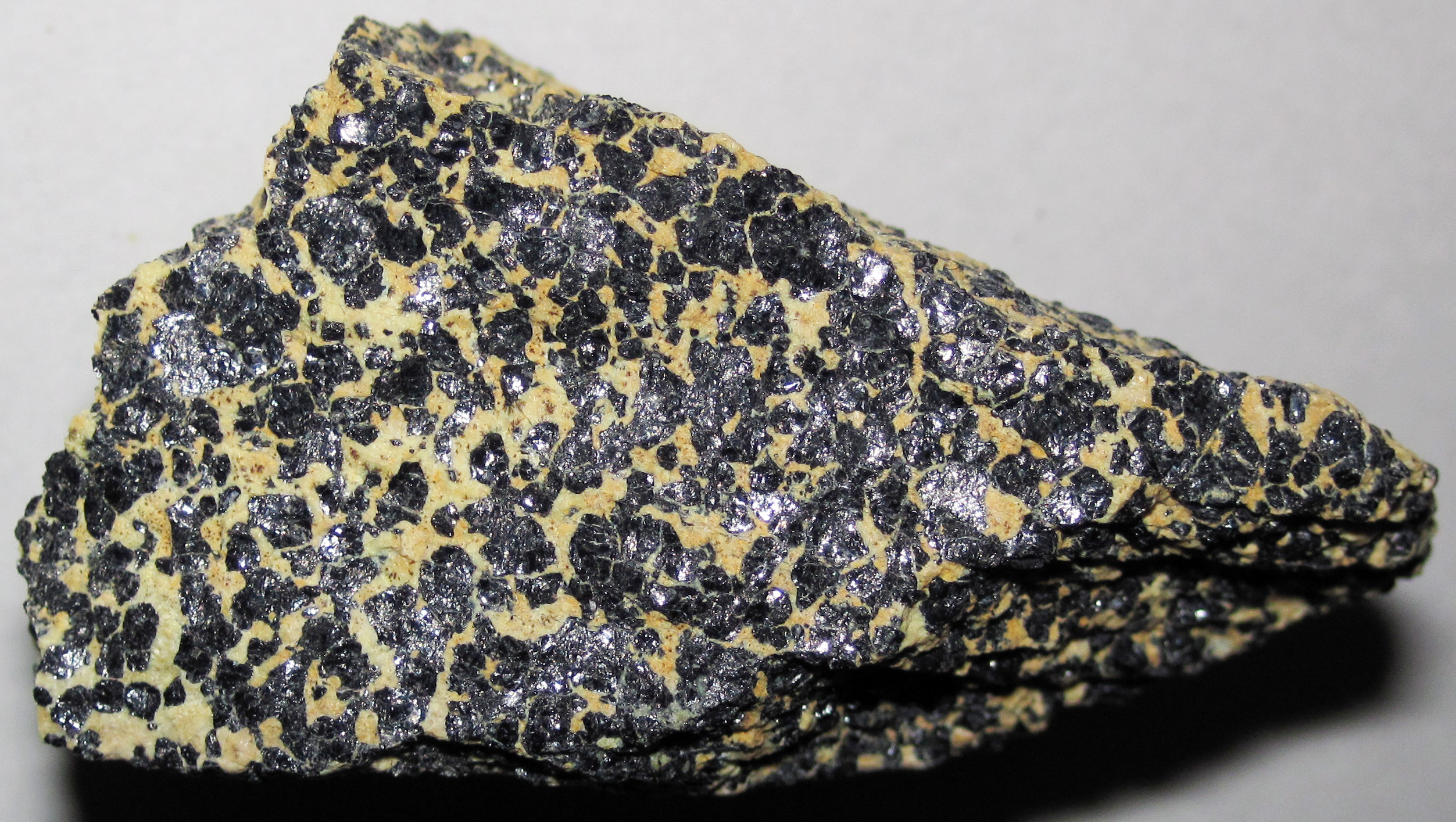
Chromitic serpentinite, Bay of Islands Ophiolite, Lewis Hills, Newfoundland

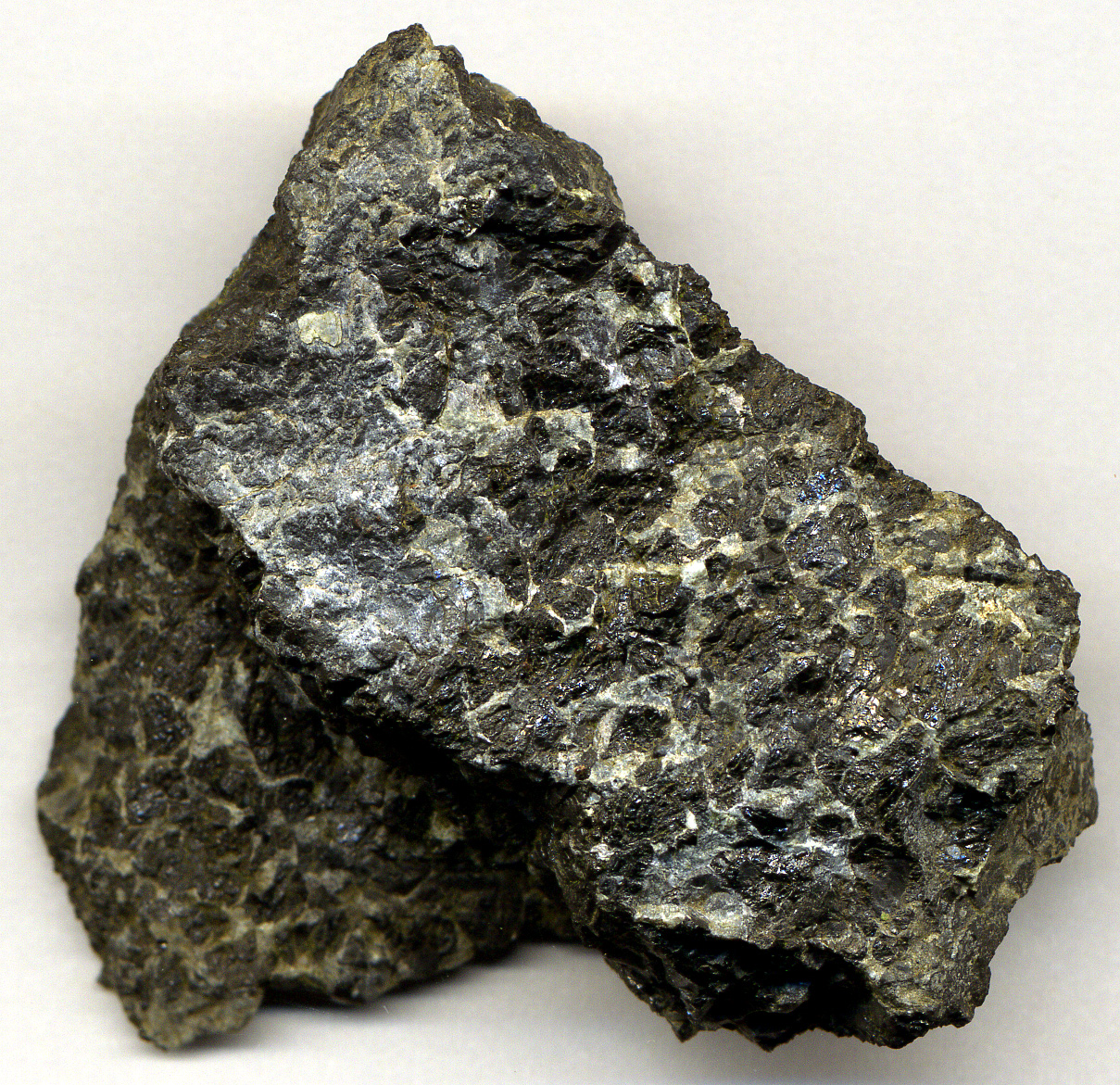
Chromitite ore with chromite (black) & talc and/or antigorite (whitish). Shetland Ophiolite Complex, c. 425–500 Ma. Shetland Islands, North Sea, UK

An ophiolite is a section of Earth's oceanic crust and the underlying upper mantle that has been uplifted and exposed, and often emplaced onto continental crustal rocks.

The Greek word ὄφις, ophis (lit. 'snake') is found in the name of ophiolites, because of the superficial texture of some of them. Serpentinite especially evokes a snakeskin. (The suffix -lite is from the Greek λῐ́θος, lithos, meaning "stone".) Some ophiolites have a green color. The origin of these rocks, present in many mountainous massifs, remained uncertain until the advent of plate tectonic theory.

Their great significance relates to their occurrence within mountain belts such as the Alps and the Himalayas, where they document the existence of former ocean basins that have now been consumed by subduction. This insight was one of the founding pillars of plate tectonics, and ophiolites have always played a central role in plate tectonic theory and the interpretation of ancient mountain belts.

== Pseudostratigraphy and definition ==
Stratigraphic sequence of an ophiolite.

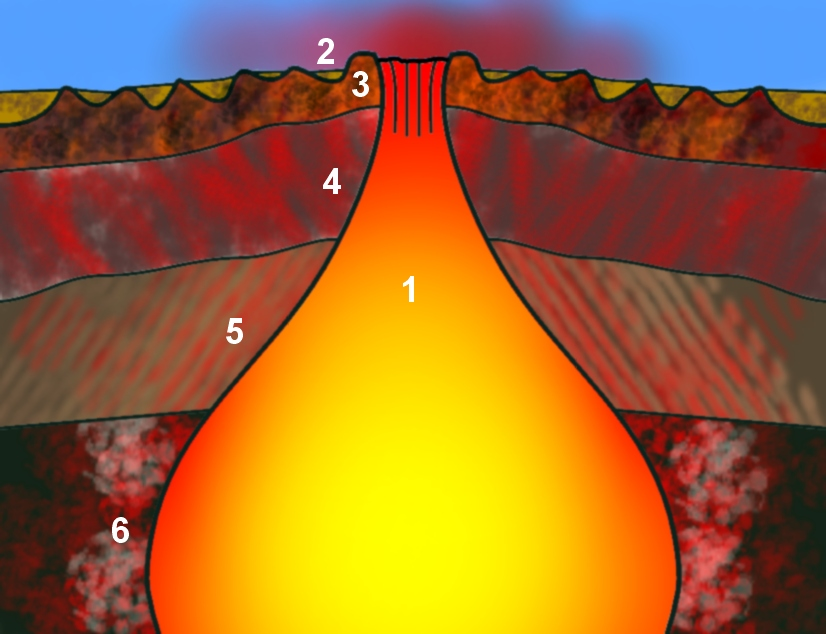
A simplified structure of an ophiolite suite: 1. axial magma chamber; 2. pelagic sediments; 3. pillow basalts; 4. sheeted basaltic dykes; 5. intrusive, layered gabbro; 6. dunite/peridotite cumulates

The stratigraphic-like sequence observed in ophiolites corresponds to the lithosphere-forming processes at mid-oceanic ridges. From top to bottom, the layers in the sequence are:

- Pelagic sediments: mostly siliceous oozes, calcareous oozes and red clays deposited since the crust formed.
- Extrusive sequence: basaltic pillow lavas show magma/seawater contact.
- Sheeted dike complex: vertical, parallel dikes that fed lavas above.
- High level intrusives: isotropic gabbro, indicative of a fractionated magma chamber.
- Layered gabbro, resulting from settling out of minerals from a magma chamber.
- Cumulate peridotite: dunite-rich layers of minerals that settled out from a magma chamber.
- Residual peridotite: harzburgite/lherzolite-rich residual upper mantle rock.

A Geological Society of America Penrose Conference on ophiolites in 1972 defined the term "ophiolite" to include all of the layers listed above, including the sediment layer formed independently of the rest of the ophiolite. This definition has been challenged recently because new studies of oceanic crust by the Integrated Ocean Drilling Program and other research cruises have shown that in situ ocean crust can be quite variable in thickness and composition, and that in places sheeted dikes sit directly on peridotite tectonite, with no intervening gabbros.

== Formation and emplacement ==
Ophiolites have been identified in most of the world's orogenic belts. However, two components of ophiolite formation are under debate: the origin of the sequence and the mechanism for ophiolite emplacement. Emplacement is the process of the sequence's uplift over lower density continental crust.

=== Origin ===
Several studies support the conclusion that ophiolites formed as oceanic lithosphere. Seismic velocity structure studies have provided most of the current knowledge of the oceanic crust's composition. For this reason, researchers carried out a seismic study on an ophiolite complex (Bay of Islands, Newfoundland) in order to establish a comparison. The study concluded that oceanic and ophiolitic velocity structures were identical, pointing to the origin of ophiolite complexes as oceanic crust. The observations that follow support this conclusion. Rocks originating on the seafloor show chemical composition comparable to unaltered ophiolite layers, from primary composition elements such as silicon and titanium to trace elements. Seafloor and ophiolitic rocks share a low occurrence of silica-rich minerals; those present have a high sodium and low potassium content. The temperature gradients of the metamorphosis of ophiolitic pillow lavas and dykes are similar to those found beneath ocean ridges today. Evidence from the metal-ore deposits present in and near ophiolites and from oxygen and hydrogen isotopes suggests that the passage of seawater through hot basalt in the vicinity of ridges dissolved and carried elements that precipitated as sulfides when the heated seawater came into contact with cold seawater. The same phenomenon occurs near oceanic ridges in a formation known as hydrothermal vents. The final line of evidence supporting the origin of ophiolites as seafloor is the region of formation of the sediments over the pillow lavas: they were deposited in water over 2 km deep, far removed from land-sourced sediments. Despite the above observations, there are inconsistencies in the theory of ophiolites as oceanic crust, which suggests that newly generated ocean crust follows the full Wilson cycle before emplacement as an ophiolite. This requires ophiolites to be much older than the orogenies on which they lie, and therefore old and cold. However, radiometric and stratigraphic dating has found ophiolites to have undergone emplacement when young and hot: most are less than 50 million years old. Ophiolites therefore cannot have followed the full Wilson cycle and are considered atypical ocean crust.

=== Ophiolite emplacement ===
There is yet no consensus on the mechanics of emplacement, the process by which oceanic crust is uplifted onto continental margins despite the relatively low density of the latter. All hypotheses regarding emplacement procedures share the same steps nonetheless: subduction initiation, thrusting of the ophiolite over a continental margin or an overriding plate at a subduction zone, and exposure at the surface.

=== Hypotheses ===
==== Emplacement by irregular continental margin ====
A hypothesis based on research conducted on the Bay of Islands complex in Newfoundland as well as the East Vardar complex in the Apuseni Mountains of Romania suggest that an irregular continental margin colliding with an island arc complex causes ophiolite generation in a back-arc basin and obduction due to compression. The continental margin, promontories and reentrants along its length, is attached to the subducting oceanic crust, which dips away from it underneath the island arc complex. As subduction takes place, the buoyant continent and island arc complex converge, initially colliding with the promontories. However, oceanic crust is still at the surface between the promontories, not having been subducted beneath the island arc yet. The subducting oceanic crust is thought to split from the continental margin to aid subduction. In the event that the rate of trench retreat is greater than that of the island arc complex's progression, trench rollback will take place, and by consequence, extension of the overriding plate will occur to allow the island arc complex to match the trench retreat's speed. The extension, a back-arc basin, generates oceanic crust: ophiolites. Finally, when the oceanic lithosphere is entirely subducted, the island arc complex's extensional regime becomes compressional. The hot, positively buoyant ocean crust from the extension will not subduct, instead obducting onto the island arc as an ophiolite. As compression persists, the ophiolite is emplaced onto the continental margin. Based on Sr and Nd isotope analyses, ophiolites have a similar composition to mid-ocean-ridge basalts, but typically have slightly elevated large ion lithophile elements and a Nb depletion. These chemical signatures support the ophiolites having formed in a back-arc basin of a subduction zone.

==== As trapped forearc ====
Ophiolite generation and subduction may also be explained, as suggested from evidence from the Coast Range ophiolite of California and Baja California, by a change in subduction location and polarity. Oceanic crust attached to a continental margin subducts beneath an island arc. Pre-ophiolitic ocean crust is generated by a back-arc basin. The collision of the continent and island arc initiates a new subduction zone at the back-arc basin, dipping in the opposite direction as the first. The created ophiolite becomes the tip of the new subduction's forearc and is uplifted (over the accretionary wedge) by detachment and compression. Verification of the two above hypotheses requires further research, as do the other hypotheses available in current literature on the subject.

== Research ==
Scientists have drilled only about 1.5 km into the 6- to 7-kilometer-thick oceanic crust, so scientific understanding of oceanic crust comes largely from comparing ophiolite structure to seismic soundings of in situ oceanic crust. Oceanic crust generally has a layered velocity structure that implies a layered rock series similar to that listed above. But in detail there are problems, with many ophiolites exhibiting thinner accumulations of igneous rock than are inferred for oceanic crust. Another problem relating to oceanic crust and ophiolites is that the thick gabbro layer of ophiolites calls for large magma chambers beneath mid-ocean ridges. However, seismic sounding of mid-ocean ridges has revealed only a few magma chambers beneath ridges, and these are quite thin. A few deep drill holes into oceanic crust have intercepted gabbro, but it is not layered like ophiolite gabbro.

The circulation of hydrothermal fluids through young oceanic crust causes serpentinization, alteration of the peridotites and alteration of minerals in the gabbros and basalts to lower temperature assemblages. For example, plagioclase, pyroxenes, and olivine in the sheeted dikes and lavas will alter to albite, chlorite, and serpentine, respectively. Often, ore bodies such as iron-rich sulfide deposits are found above highly altered epidosites (epidote-quartz rocks) that are evidence of relict black smokers, which continue to operate within the seafloor spreading centers of ocean ridges today.

Thus, there is reason to believe that ophiolites are indeed oceanic mantle and crust; however, certain problems arise when looking closer. Beyond issues of layer thicknesses mentioned above, a problem arises concerning compositional differences of silica (SiO_{2}) and titania (TiO_{2}). Ophiolite basalt contents place them in the domain of subduction zones (~55% silica, <1% TiO_{2}), whereas mid-ocean ridge basalts typically have ~50% silica and 1.5–2.5% TiO_{2}. These chemical differences extend to a range of trace elements as well (that is, chemical elements occurring in amounts of 1000 ppm or less). In particular, trace elements associated with subduction zone (island arc) volcanics tend to be high in ophiolites, whereas trace elements that are high in ocean ridge basalts but low in subduction zone volcanics are also low in ophiolites.

Additionally, the crystallization order of feldspar and pyroxene (clino- and orthopyroxene) in the gabbros is reversed, and ophiolites also appear to have a multi-phase magmatic complexity on par with subduction zones. Indeed, there is increasing evidence that most ophiolites are generated when subduction begins and thus represent fragments of fore-arc lithosphere. This led to introduction of the term "supra-subduction zone" (SSZ) ophiolite in the 1980s to acknowledge that some ophiolites are more closely related to island arcs than ocean ridges. Consequently, some of the classic ophiolite occurrences thought of as being related to seafloor spreading (Troodos in Cyprus, Semail in Oman) were found to be "SSZ" ophiolites, formed by rapid extension of fore-arc crust during subduction initiation.

A fore-arc setting for most ophiolites also solves the otherwise-perplexing problem of how oceanic lithosphere can be emplaced on top of continental crust. It appears that continental accretion sediments, if carried by the downgoing plate into a subduction zone, will jam it up and cause subduction to cease, resulting in the rebound of the accretionary prism with fore-arc lithosphere (ophiolite) on top of it. Ophiolites with compositions comparable with hotspot-type eruptive settings or normal mid-oceanic ridge basalt are rare, and those examples are generally strongly dismembered in subduction zone accretionary complexes.

== Groups and assemblages ==
Classic ophiolite assemblage in Cyprus showing sheeted lava intersected by a dyke with pillow lava on top.

Ophiolites are common in orogenic belts of Mesozoic age, like those formed by the closure of the Tethys Ocean. Ophiolites in Archean and Paleoproterozoic domains are rare.

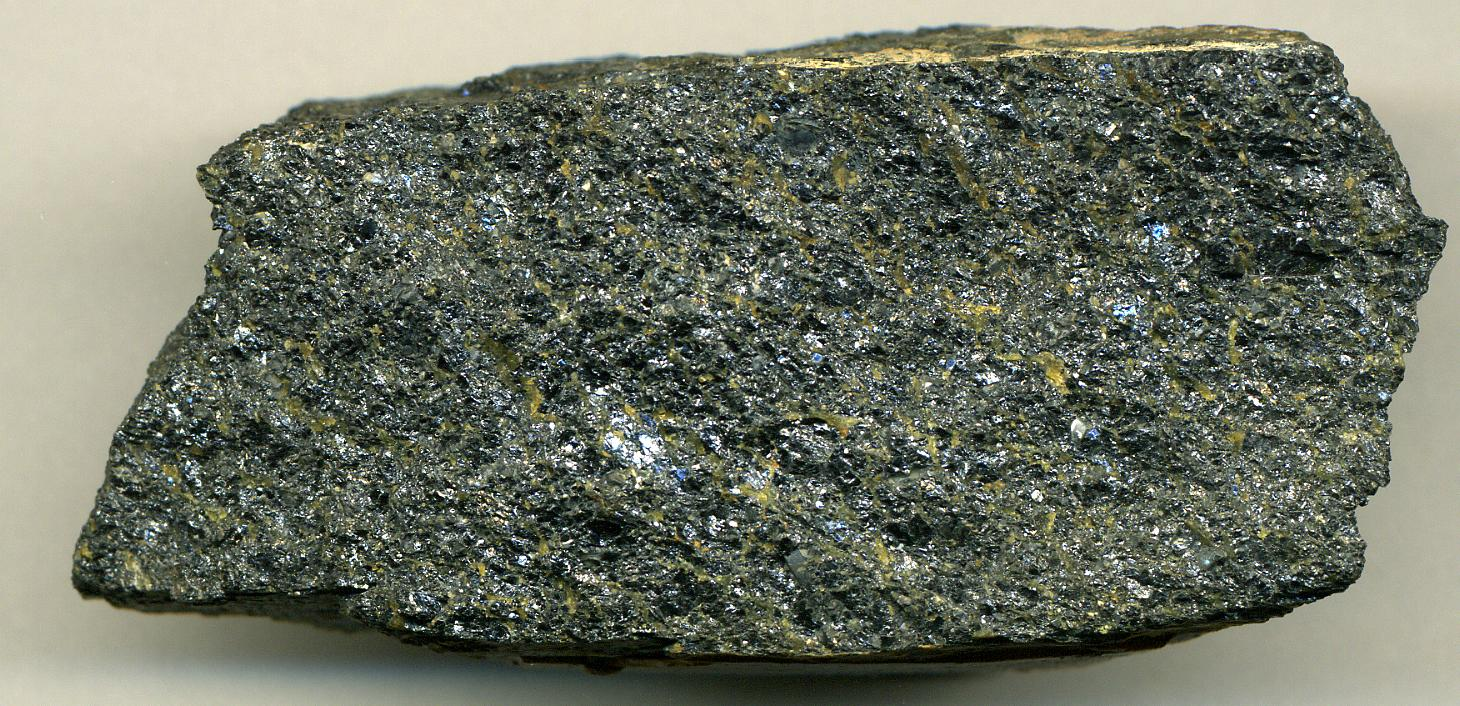
Olivine chromitite sample (7.3 centimeters across) from the Troodos Ophiolite Complex, Late Cretaceous, Cyprus. Mined as chromite ore.

Most ophiolites can be divided into one of two groups: Tethyan and Cordilleran. Tethyan ophiolites are characteristic of those that occur in the eastern Mediterranean sea area, e.g. Troodos in Cyprus, and in the Middle East, such as Semail in Oman, which consist of relatively complete rock series corresponding to the classic ophiolite assemblage and which have been emplaced onto a passive continental margin more or less intact (Tethys is the name given to the ancient sea that once separated Europe and Africa). Cordilleran ophiolites are characteristic of those that occur in the mountain belts of western North America (the "Cordillera" or backbone of the continent). These ophiolites sit on subduction zone accretionary complexes (subduction complexes) and have no association with a passive continental margin. They include the Coast Range ophiolite of California, the Josephine ophiolite of the Klamath Mountains (California, Oregon), and ophiolites in the southern Andes of South America. Despite their differences in mode of emplacement, both types of ophiolite are exclusively supra-subduction zone (SSZ) in origin.

Based on mode of occurrences, the Neoproterozoic ophiolites appear to show characteristics of both mid-oceanic ridge basalt (MORB)-type and SSZ-type ophiolites and are classified from oldest to youngest into: (1) MORB intact ophiolites (MIO); (2) dismembered ophiolites (DO); and (3) arc-associated ophiolites (AAO) (El Bahariya, 2018). Collectively, the investigated ophiolites of the Central Eastern Desert (CED) fall into both MORB/back-arc basin basalt (BABB) ophiolites and SSZ ophiolites. They are spatially and temporally unrelated, and thus, it seems likely that the two types are not petrogenetically related. Ophiolites occur in different geological settings, and they represent change of the tectonic setting of the ophiolites from MORB to SSZ with time.

== Origin and evolution of the concept ==
The term ophiolite originated from publications of Alexandre Brongniart in 1813 and 1821. In the first, he used ophiolite for serpentinite rocks found in large-scale breccias called mélanges. In the second publication, he expanded the definition to encompass a variety of igneous rocks as well such as gabbro, diabase, ultramafic and volcanic rocks. Ophiolites thus became a name for a well-known association of rocks occurring in the Alps and Apennines of Italy. Following work in these two mountains systems, Gustav Steinmann defined what later became known as the "Steinmann Trinity": the mixture of serpentine, diabase-spilite and chert. The recognition of the Steinmann Trinity served years later to build up the theory around seafloor spreading and plate tectonics. A key observation by Steinmann was that ophiolites were associated to sedimentary rocks reflecting former deep sea environments. Steinmann himself interpreted ophiolites (the Trinity) using the geosyncline concept. He held that Alpine ophiolites were "submarine effusions issuing along thrust faults into the active flank of an asymmetrically shortening geosyncline". The apparent lack of ophiolites in the Peruvian Andes, Steinmann theorized, was either due to the Andes being preceded by a shallow geosyncline or representing just the margin of a geosyncline. Thus, Cordilleran-type and Alpine-type mountains were to be different in this regard. In Hans Stille's models a type of geosyncline called eugeosynclines were characterized by producing an "initial magmatism" that in some cases corresponded to ophiolitic magmatism.

As plate tectonic theory prevailed in geology and geosyncline theory became outdated ophiolites were interpreted in the new framework. They were recognized as fragments of oceanic lithosphere, and dykes were viewed as the result of extensional tectonics at mid-ocean ridges. The plutonic rocks found in ophiolites were understood as remnants of former magma chambers.

In 1973, Akiho Miyashiro revolutionized common conceptions of ophiolites and proposed an island arc origin for the famous Troodos Ophiolite in Cyprus, arguing that numerous lavas and dykes in the ophiolite had calc-alkaline chemistries.

== Notable examples ==
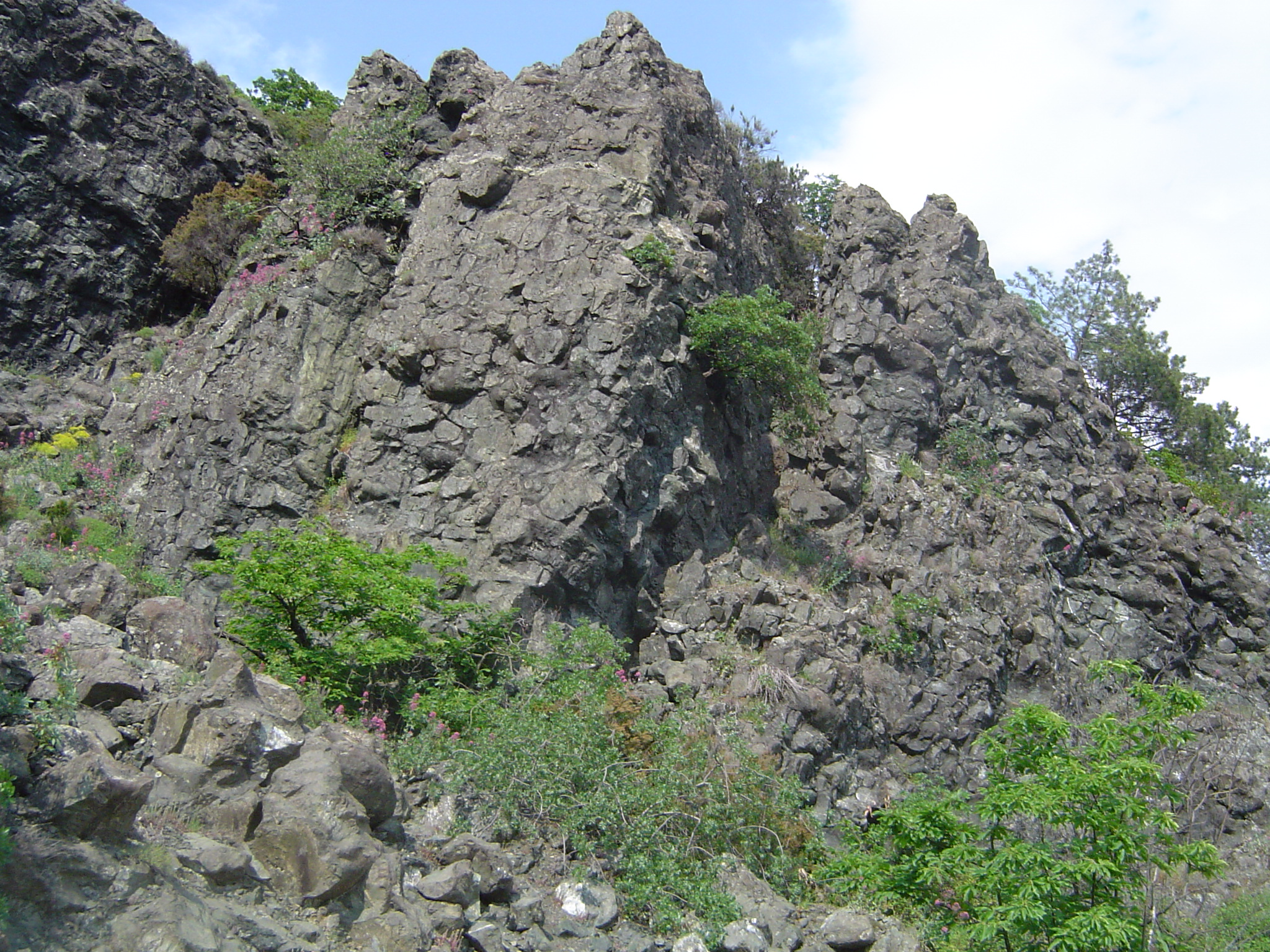
A pillow lava from an ophiolite sequence, Northern Apennines, Italy

Examples of ophiolites that have been influential in the study of these rocks bodies are:

- Coast Range Ophiolite in the California Coast Ranges, from Santa Barbara through San Francisco Counties, California.
- Semail Ophiolite in Oman and the United Arab Emirates, widely considered one of the best exposed ophiolite sequences
- Troodos Ophiolite in the Troodos Mountains of Cyprus, of economic interest since it contains the copper deposits of Cyprus (from which copper is named)
- Piney Branch Complex located near Fairfax, Virginia, is a Neoproterozoic ophiolite. The formation contains highly metamorphosized mafic and ultramafic rocks. Rocks found here include Serpentinite, asbestiform actinolite schist, Tremolite, and soapstone.
- Macquarie Island, Tasmania, Australia was named a UNESCO World Heritage Site in 1997, as "the only known example of an ophiolite ... complex in the process of being formed and currently in its original geological setting".
- Bay of Islands Ophiolite in Gros Morne National Park, Newfoundland, named a UNESCO World Heritage Site in 1987 because of its superbly exposed complete ophiolite stratigraphic sequence
- Yakuno, Horokanai, and Poroshiri, three full ophiolite sequences in Japan
- Dun Mountain Ophiolite Belt, South Island, New Zealand. The rocktype dunite is named after this locality.
- Zambales ophiolite complex including the Coto and Acoje blocks, Luzon, Philippines. The c. 45 Myr old Zambales ophiolite forms part of the basement of the Luzon island arc complex.
- Naga Hills Ophiolite and Andaman ophiolite belt, Northeast India
- Neoproterozoic ophiolites of the Central Eastern Desert, Egypt (El Bahariya, 2018).
- Himalayan Ophiolites, Nidar, Shergol (Manas et al., 2021)
