= Piney Branch Complex =

Ancient Neoproterozoic ophiolite formation

- Stratigraphic range: ~550 Ma
- Map of the Piney Branch Complex, USGS
- Type: Geological formation
- Underlies: Popes Head Formation
- Overlies: Yorkshire Formation
- Area: 9 km^{2} (3.5 sq mi)

Lithology
- Primary: serpentinite, soapstone, asbestiform actinolite schist, tremolite, metagabbro

Location
- Location: Fairfax County, Virginia
- Coordinates: 38.85°N 77.30°W
- Region: Northern Virginia
- Country: United States
- Location of the Piney Branch Complex

The Piney Branch Complex is an ancient Neoproterozoic ophiolite formation in Fairfax County, Virginia. The formation has undergone intense deformation and alterations of ultramafic and mafic rocks. The complex is also interpreted as a mélange setting. It connects with other ophiolites further north in Maryland, and southeastern Pennsylvania.

== Geography ==
The Piney Branch Complex begins near Oakton, Virginia. The formation then takes a southwesterly direction where it crosses Interstate 66. South of the Interstate, it enters the western city limits of Fairfax, Virginia. It continues southwest before turned more west southwest near the town of Braddock, Virginia. West of Braddock, it snakes west then northwest to it northern terminus around Willow Pond Park in Fairfax, Virginia.

Further south, the formation continues on a south southwest direction around Braddock Park. It continues almost due south until it ends just northeast of Manassas Park, Virginia.

Formations that flank the complex include the Yorkshire formation, (a mélange), multiple schist formations to the northeast. Further west, the complex interacts with sedimentary rocks associated with the Culpeper Basin. These formations include:

- Reston Member
- Poolesville Member
- Formations of diabase
- Formations of thermally metamorphosed rocks.

== Geology ==
The Piney Branch Complex dates to the late Neoproterozoic. It is thought that the complex was created when subduction initiated in the Iapetus Ocean. During subduction initiation, extensional forces acted on the overriding plate. This can cause small rifts to form very close to the new trench. Once rifts are established, decompression melting occurs. This process is called Suprasubduction. It's thought that the Piney Branch ophiolites started in this way.

During the Alleghenian Orogeny, the Piney Branch Complex underwent extreme high grade metamorphosis. There are at least five separate folding events that severely deformed the original rocks. Peridot, pyroxenite, and gabbro have been metamorphosed into serpentinite, soapstone, asbestiform actinolte schist, tremolite, and metagabbro.

== Asbestos exposure ==
Due to the abundance of asbestiform bedrocks, the Piney Branch Complex poses a risk of asbestos exposure. Serpentinite (chrysotile), actinolite, and tremolite have all been found in the formation. Fairfax County notes that "asbestos fibers are locked up in the rock and separated from the surface by several feet of soil". Furthermore, excavations have occasionally encountered asbestiform tremolite and actinolite. However, surface exposures of asbestos do occur in Fairfax County. "Natural asbestos in soil is known to exist between Stringfellow Rd and Willowmeade Dr".
