= Yu-stone =

Yu-stone may refer to either of two minerals:

- Actinolite
- Jadeite
