= Serpentinite =

Rock formed by transformation of olivine

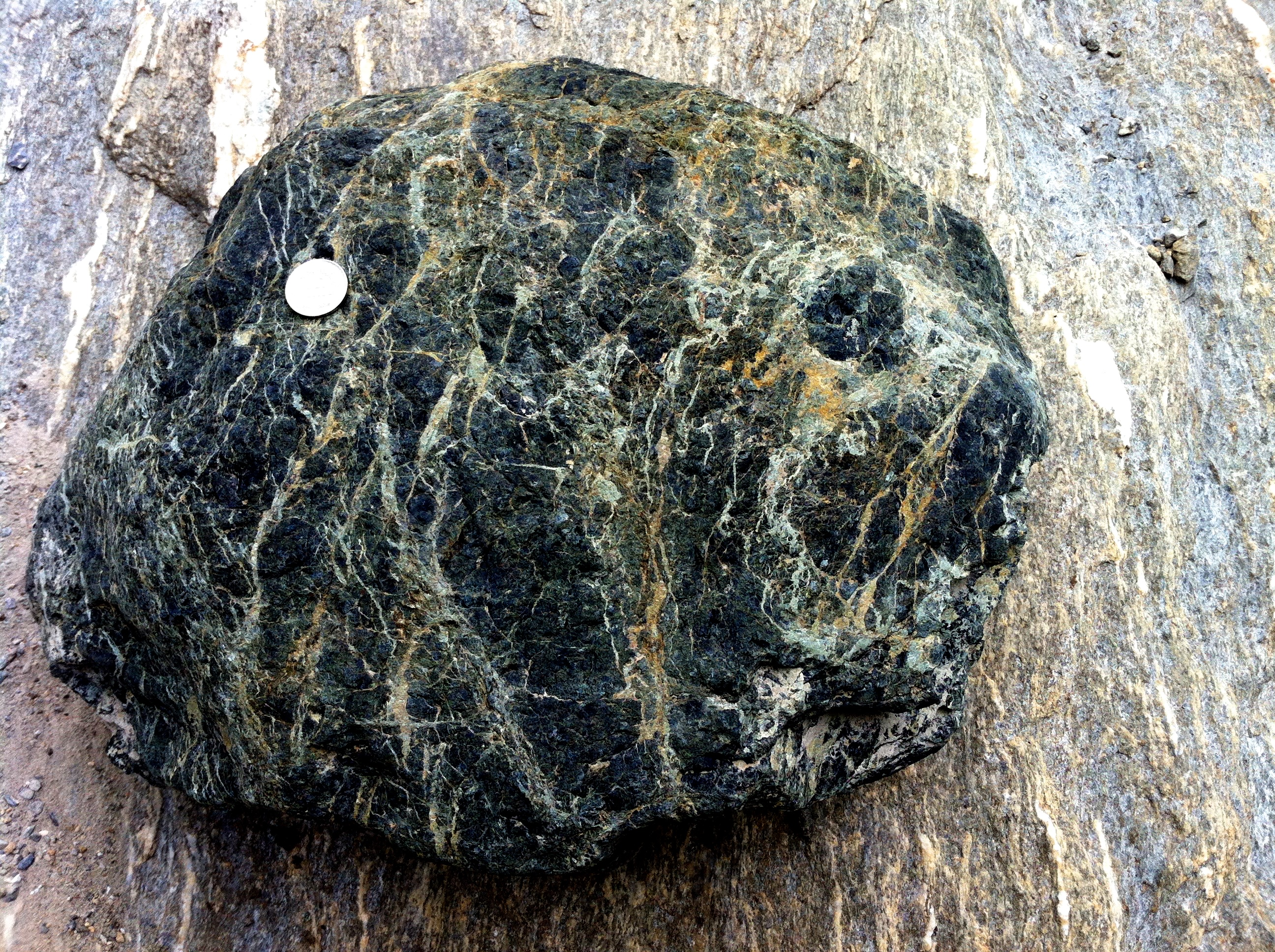
Serpentinite from the Maurienne valley, Savoie, French Alps

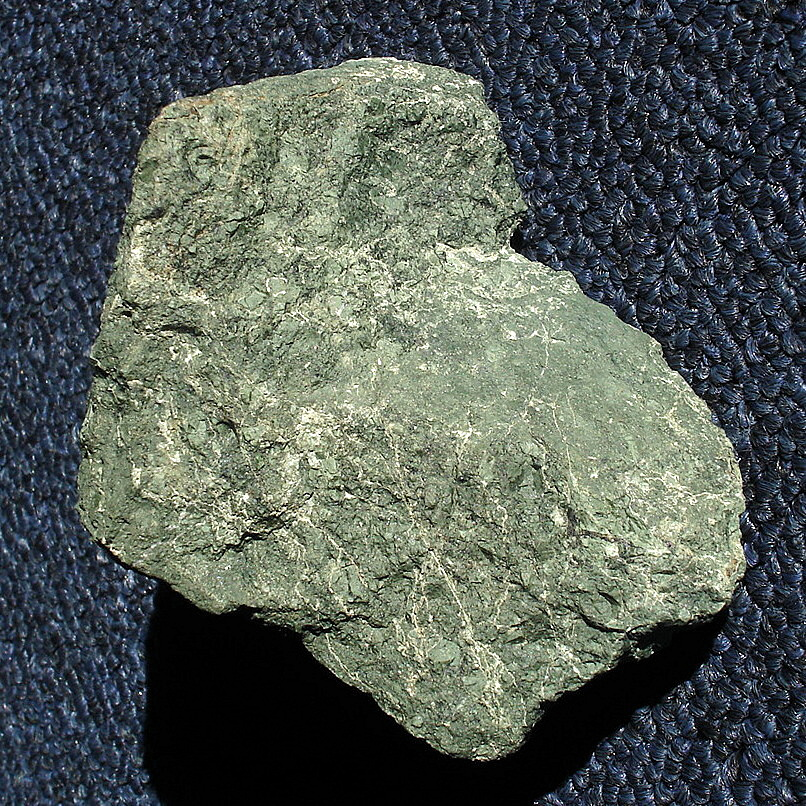
Sample of serpentinite from the Golden Gate National Recreation Area, California, United States

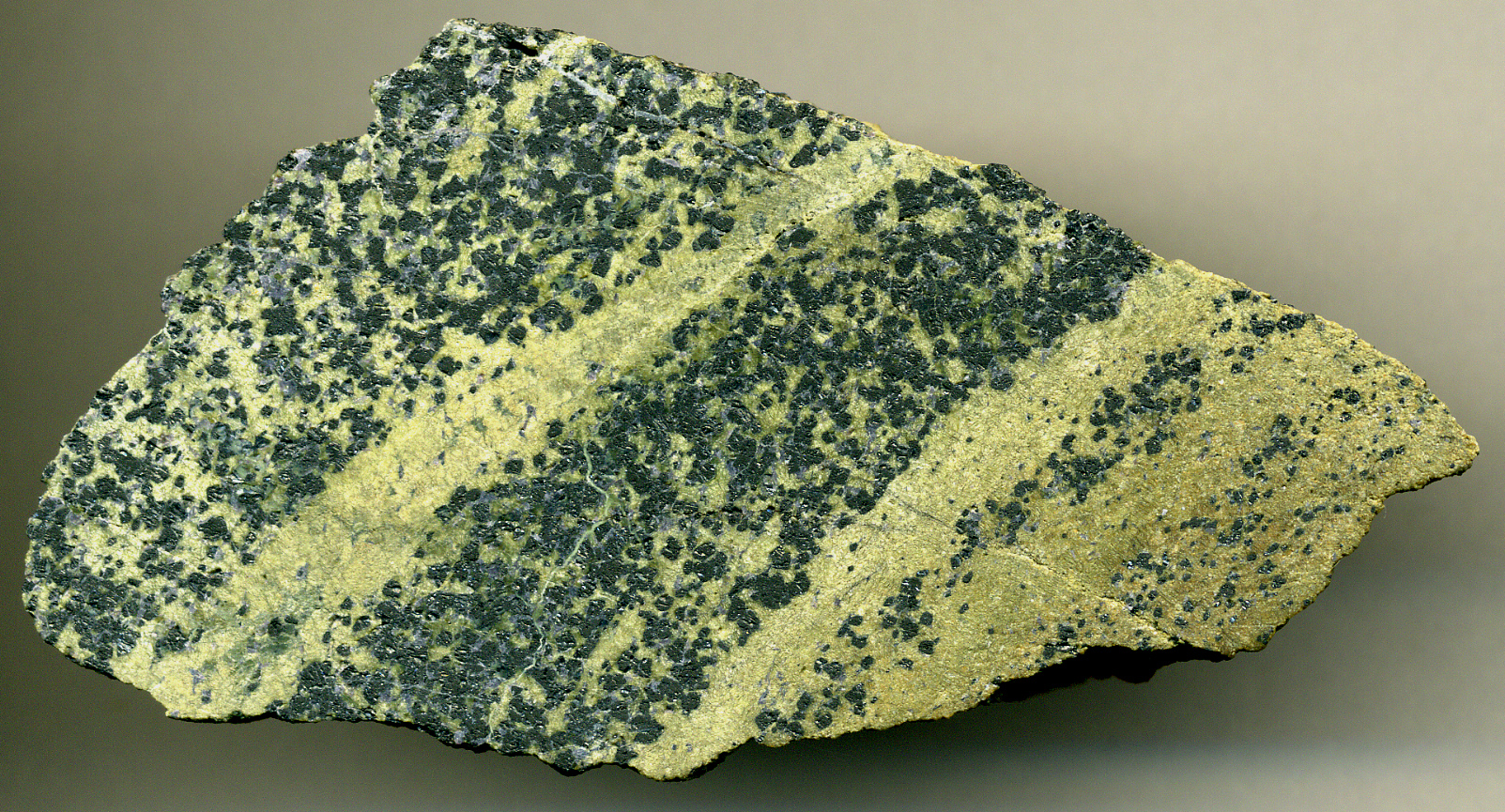
Chromitic serpentinite (7.9 cm (3.1 in) across), Styria Province, Austria. Protolith was a Proterozoic-Early Paleozoic upper mantle dunite peridotite that has been multiply metamorphosed during the Devonian, Permian, and Mesozoic.

Serpentinite found in central North Carolina

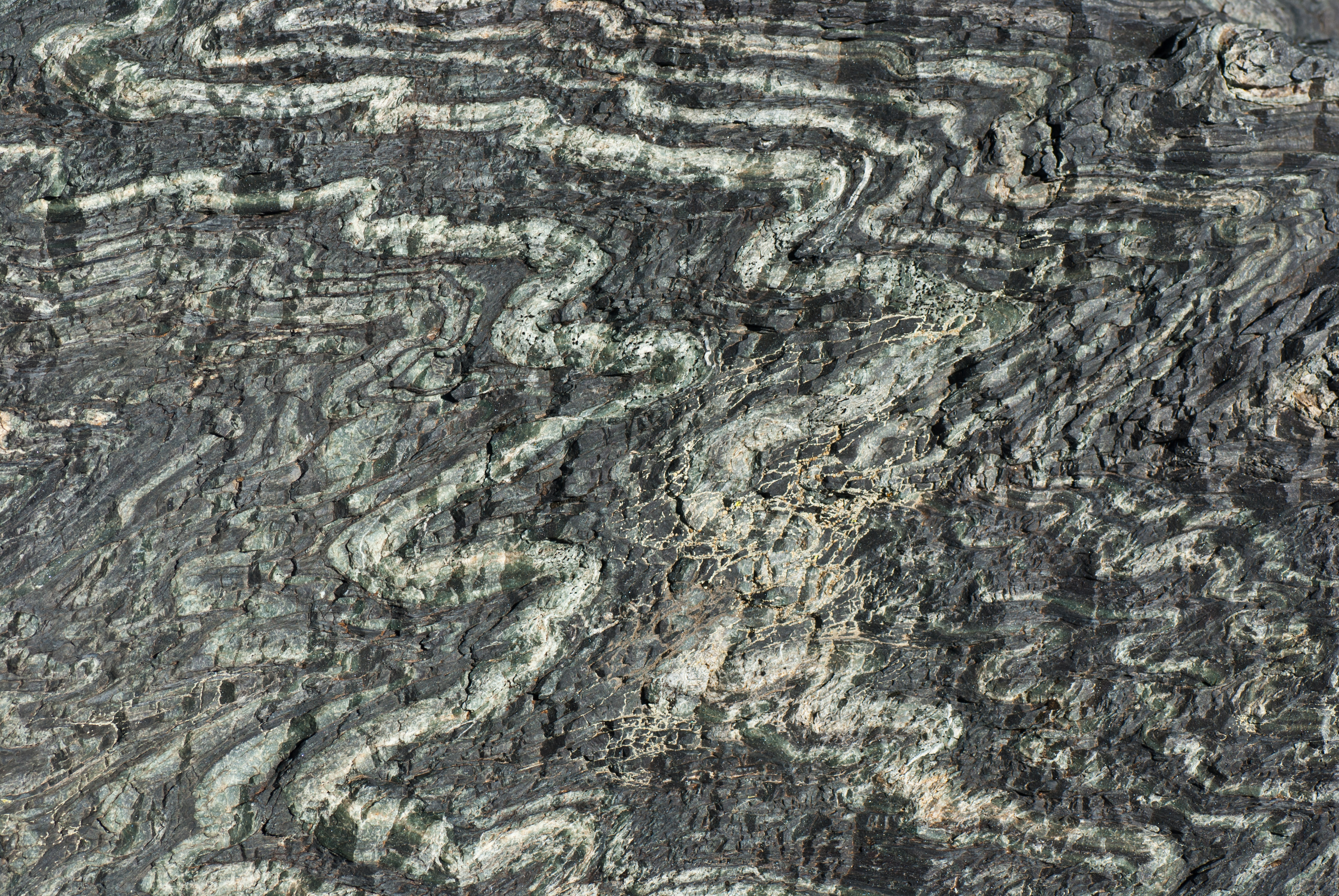
Tightly folded serpentinite from the Tux Alps, Austria. Closeup view about 30 cm × 20 cm (12 in × 8 in).

Serpentinite is a metamorphic rock composed predominantly of serpentine group minerals formed by serpentinization of mafic or ultramafic rocks. The ancient origin of the name is uncertain; it may be from the similarity of its texture or color to snake skin. Greek pharmacologist Dioscorides (AD 50) recommended this rock to prevent snakebite.

Serpentinite has been called serpentine or serpentine rock, particularly in older geological texts and in wider cultural settings.

Most of the chemical reactions necessary to synthesize acetyl-CoA, essential to basic biochemical pathways of life, take place during serpentinization. Serpentinite thermal vents are therefore considered a candidate for the origin of life on Earth.

== Formation and mineralogy ==
Serpentinite is formed by near to complete serpentinization of mafic or ultramafic rocks. Serpentinite is formed from mafic rock that is hydrated by carbon dioxide-deficient sea water that is pressed into the rock at great depths below the ocean floor. This occurs at mid-ocean ridges and in the forearc mantle of subduction zones.

The final mineral composition of serpentinite is usually dominated by antigorite, lizardite, chrysotile (minerals of the serpentine subgroup), and magnetite (Fe_{3}O_{4}), with brucite (Mg(OH)_{2}) less commonly present. Lizardite, chrysotile, and antigorite all have approximately the formula Mg_{3}(Si_{2}O_{5})(OH)_{4} or (Mg^{2+}, Fe^{2+})_{3}Si_{2}O_{5}(OH)_{4}, but differ in minor components and in form. Accessory minerals, present in small quantities, include awaruite, other native metal minerals, and sulfide minerals.

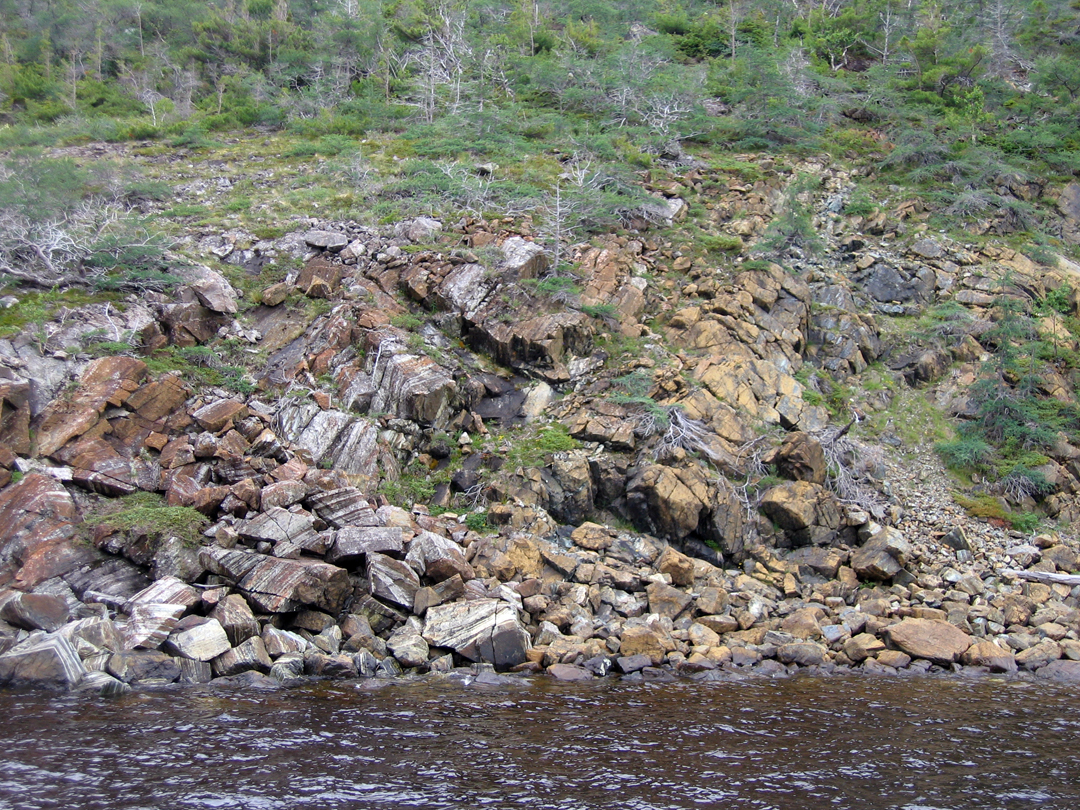
Ophiolite of the Gros Morne National Park, Newfoundland. Ophiolites characteristically have a serpentinite component.

=== Hydrogen production ===
The serpentinization reaction involving the transformation of fayalite (Fe-end member of olivine) by water into magnetite and quartz also produces molecular hydrogen H_{2} according to the following reaction:

$$\ce{3 Fe2SiO4 + 2 H2O -> 2 Fe3O4 + 3 SiO2 + 2 H2}$$

This reaction closely resembles the Schikorr reaction also producing hydrogen gas by oxidation of Fe^{2+} ions into Fe^{3+} ions by the protons H^{+} of water. Two H^{+} are then reduced into H_{2}.

$$\ce{3 Fe(OH)2 -> Fe3O4 + 2 H2O + H2}$$

In the Schikorr reaction, the two H^{+} reduced into H_{2} are these from two OH^{−} anions, then transformed into two oxide anions (O^{2−}) directly incorporated into the magnetite crystal lattice while the water in excess is liberated as a reaction by-product.

Hydrogen produced by the serpentinization reaction is important because it can fuel microbial activity in the deep subsurface environment.

=== Hydrothermal vents and mud volcanoes ===
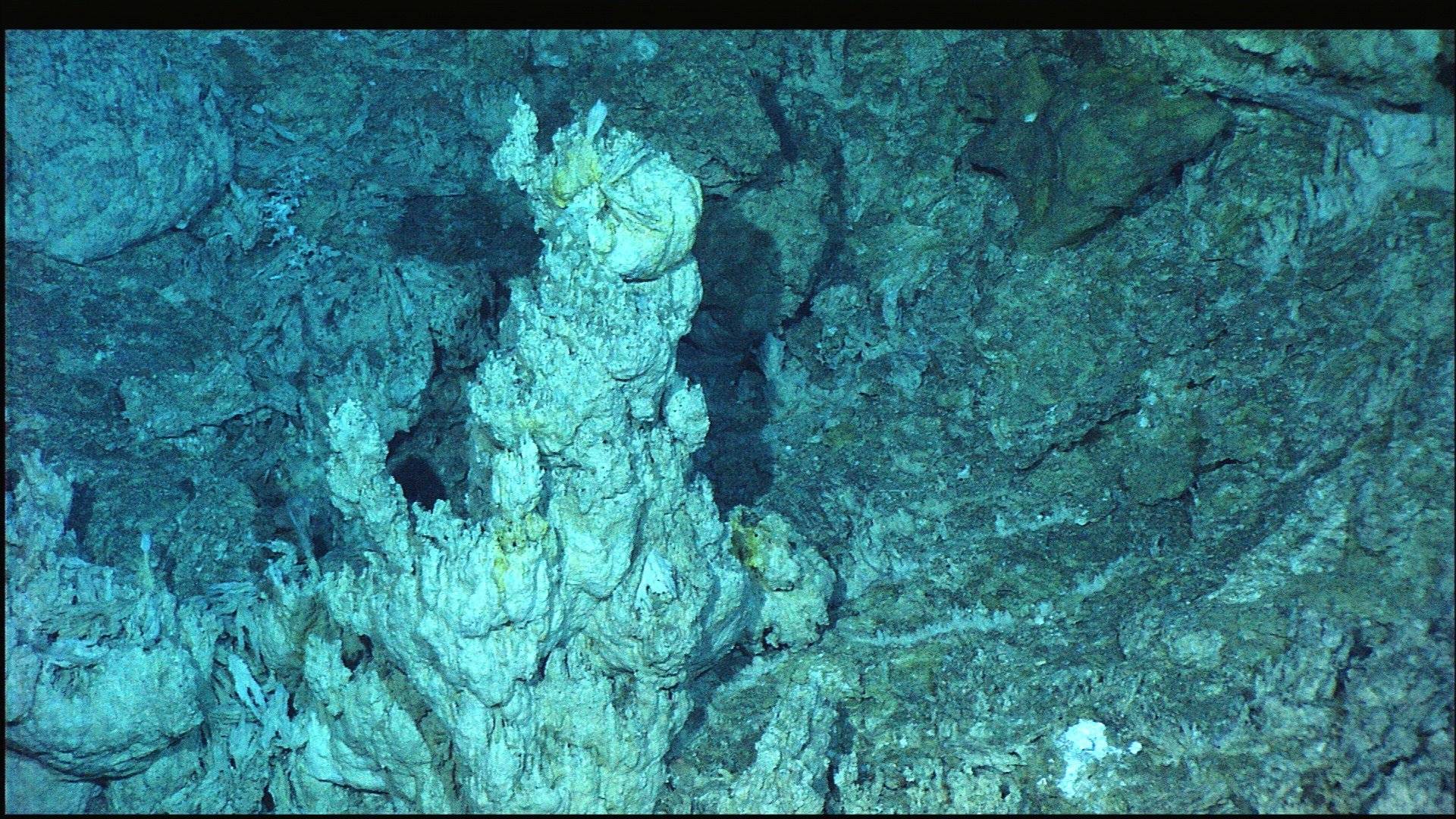
A white carbonate spire in the Lost City hydrothermal field

Deep sea hydrothermal vents located on serpentinite close to the axis of mid-ocean ridges generally resemble black smokers located on basalt, but emit complex hydrocarbon molecules. The Rainbow field of the Mid-Atlantic Ridge is an example of such hydrothermal vents. Serpentinization alone cannot provide the heat supply for these vents, which must be driven mostly by magmatism. However, the Lost City Hydrothermal Field, located off the axis of the Mid-Atlantic Ridge, may be driven solely by heat of serpentinization. Its vents are unlike black smokers, emitting relatively cool fluids (40 to 75 °C (104 to 167 °F)) that are highly alkaline, high in magnesium, and low in hydrogen sulfide. The vents build up very large chimneys, up to 60 meters (200 ft) in height, composed of carbonate minerals and brucite. Lush microbial communities are associated with the vents. Though the vents themselves are not composed of serpentinite, they are hosted in serpentinite estimated to have formed at a temperature of about 200 °C (392 °F). Sepiolite deposits on mid-ocean ridges may have formed through serpentinite-driven hydrothermal activity. However, geologists continue to debate whether serpentinization alone can account for the heat flux from the Lost City field.

The forearc of the Marianas subduction zone hosts large serpentinite mud volcanoes, which erupt serpentinite mud that rises through faults from the underlying serpentinized forearc mantle. Study of these mud volcanoes gives insights into subduction processes, and the high pH fluids emitted at the volcanoes support a microbial community. Experimental drilling into the gabbro layer of oceanic crust near mid-ocean ridges has demonstrated the presence of a sparse population of hydrocarbon-degrading bacteria. These may feed on hydrocarbons produced by serpentinization of the underlying ultramafic rock.

==== Potential 'cradle of life' ====
Serpentinite thermal vents are a candidate for the environment in which life on Earth originated. Most of the chemical reactions necessary to synthesize acetyl-CoA, essential to basic biochemical pathways of life, take place during serpentinization. The sulfide-metal clusters that activate many enzymes resemble sulfide minerals formed during serpentinization.

== Ecology ==
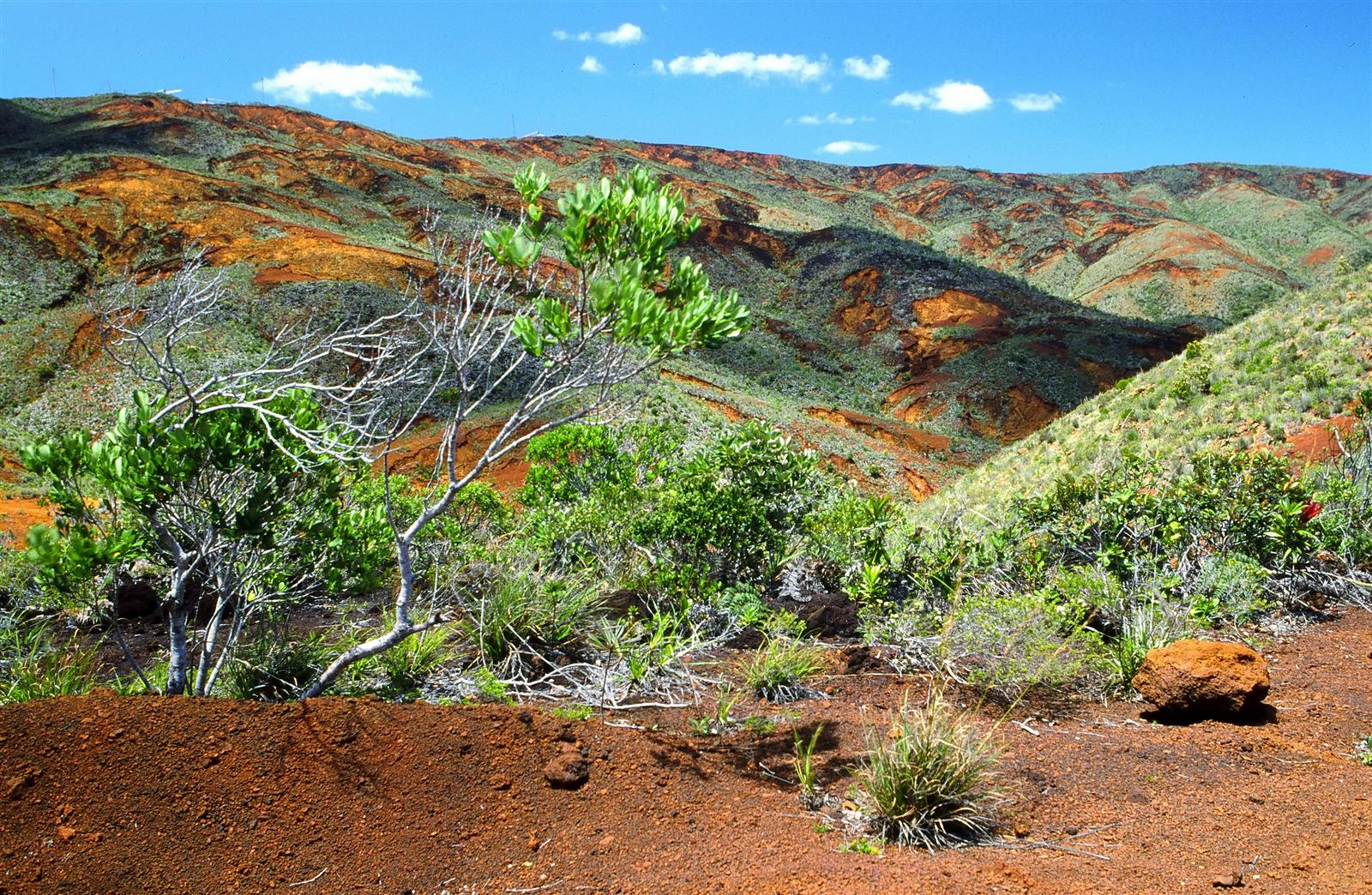
Serpentinite ecosystem in the south of New Caledonia

Soil cover over serpentinite bedrock tends to be thin or absent. Soil with serpentine is poor in calcium and other major plant nutrients, but rich in elements toxic to plants such as chromium and nickel. Some species of plants, such as Clarkia franciscana and certain species of manzanita, are adapted to living on serpentinite outcrops. However, because serpentinite outcrops are few and isolated, their plant communities are ecological islands and these distinctive species are often highly endangered. On the other hand, plant communities adapted to living on the serpentine outcrops of New Caledonia resist displacement by introduced species that are poorly adapted to this environment.

Serpentine soils are widely distributed on Earth, in part mirroring the distribution of ophiolites and other serpentine bearing rocks. There are outcroppings of serpentine soils in the Balkan Peninsula, Turkey, the island of Cyprus, the Alps, Cuba, and New Caledonia. In North America, serpentine soils also are present in small but widely distributed areas on the eastern slope of the Appalachian Mountains in the eastern United States, and in the Pacific Ranges of Oregon and California.

== Occurrences ==
Notable occurrences of serpentinite are found at Thetford Mines, Quebec; Lake Valhalla, New Jersey; Gila County, Arizona; Lizard complex, Lizard Point, Cornwall; and in localities in Greece, Italy, and other parts of Europe. Notable ophiolites containing serpentinite include the Semail Ophiolite of Oman, the Troodos Ophiolite of Cyprus, the Newfoundland ophiolites, the Piney Branch Complex in northern Virginia and the Main Ophiolite Belt of New Guinea. Another occurrence of serpentinite is in Chester County, Pennsylvania.

== Uses ==
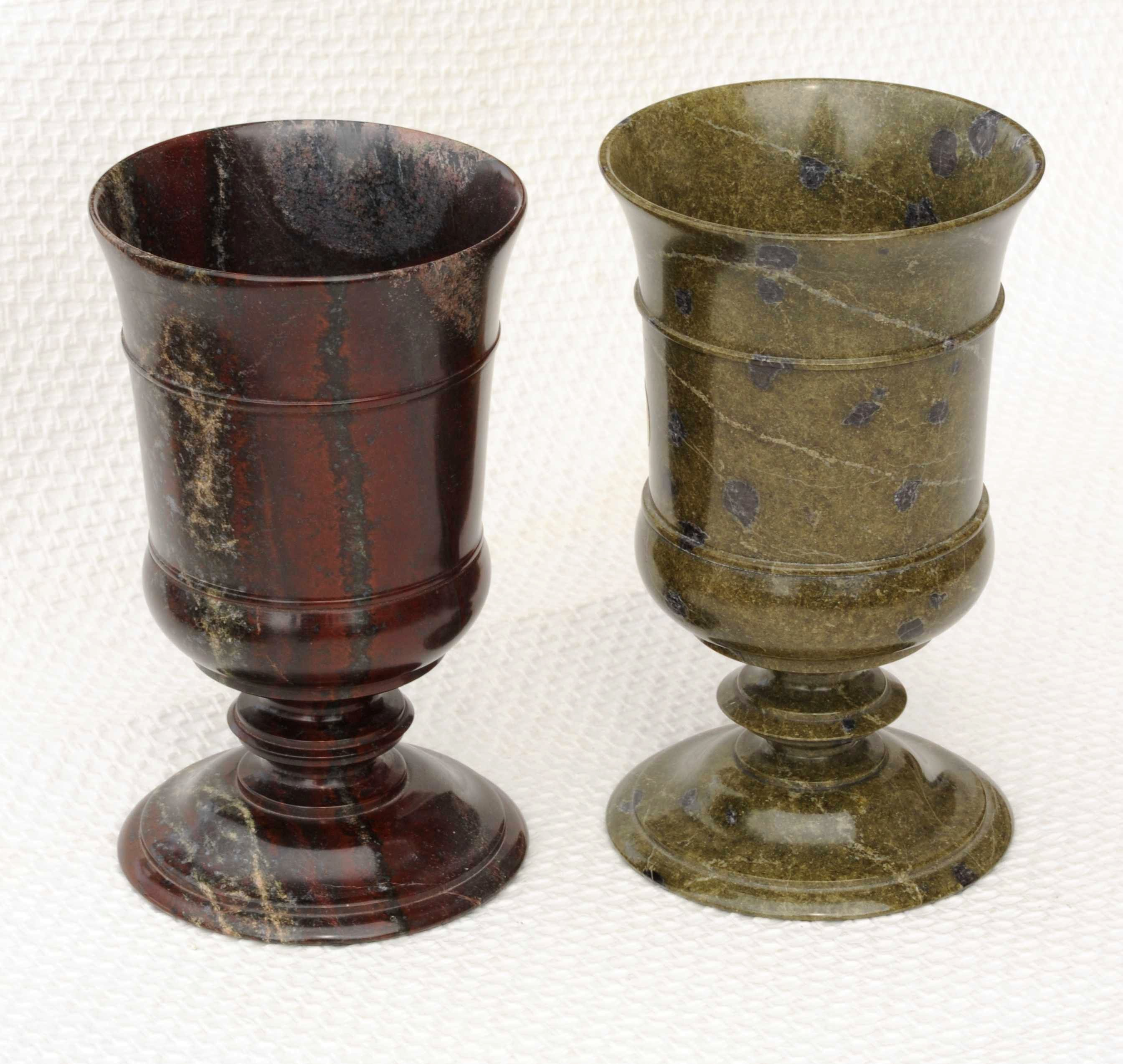
Drinking cups, examples of serpentinite-turning from Zöblitz in the Erzgebirgskreis

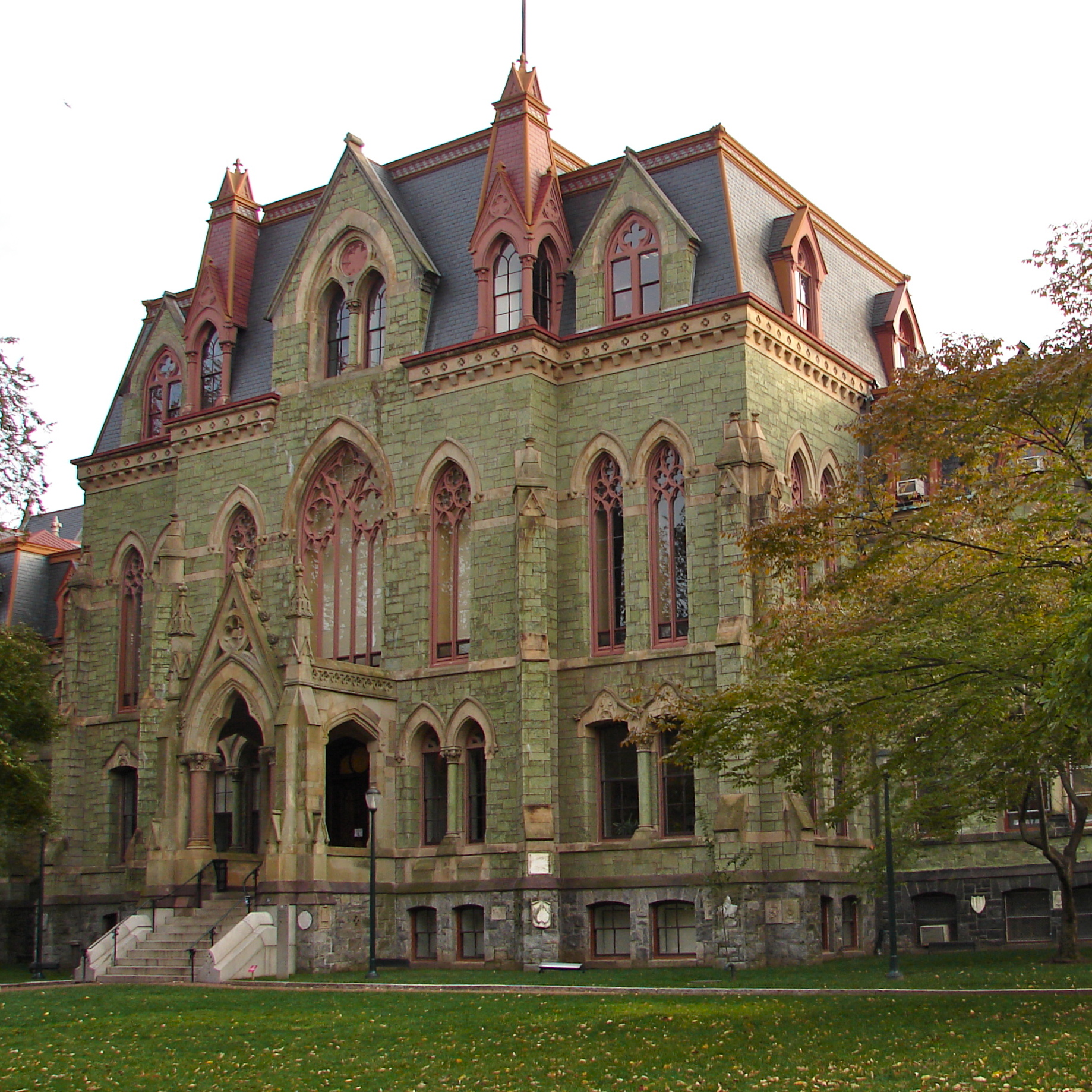
College Hall at University of Pennsylvania

=== Decorative stone in architecture and art ===
Serpentine group minerals have a Mohs hardness of 2.5 to 3.5, so serpentinite is easily carved. Grades of serpentinite higher in calcite, along with the verd antique (breccia form of serpentinite), have historically been used as decorative stones for their marble-like qualities. College Hall at the University of Pennsylvania, for example, is constructed out of serpentine. Popular sources in Europe before contact with the Americas were the mountainous Piedmont region of Italy and Larissa, Greece. Serpentinites are used in many ways in the arts and crafts. For example, the rock has been turned in Zöblitz in Saxony for several hundred years.

=== By the Inuit ===
The Inuit and other indigenous people of the Arctic areas (and less so of more southern areas) used a carved lamp made of serpentinite, called a qulliq or kudlik, to burn oil or fat to heat, to make light and to cook with. The Inuit also used serpentinite to make tools, and more recently carvings of animals for commerce.

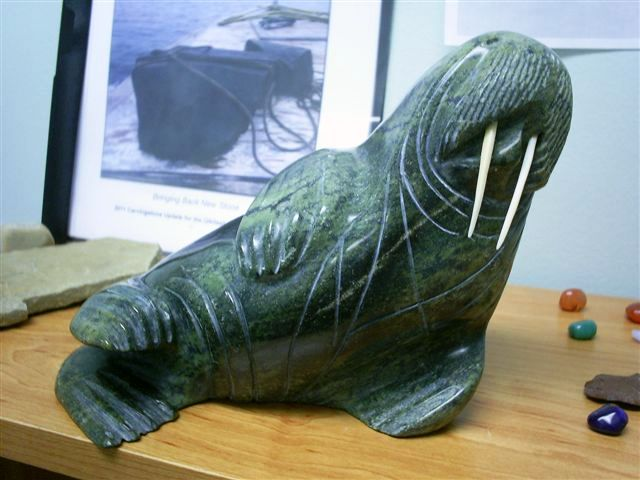
Magnetic serpentine walrus

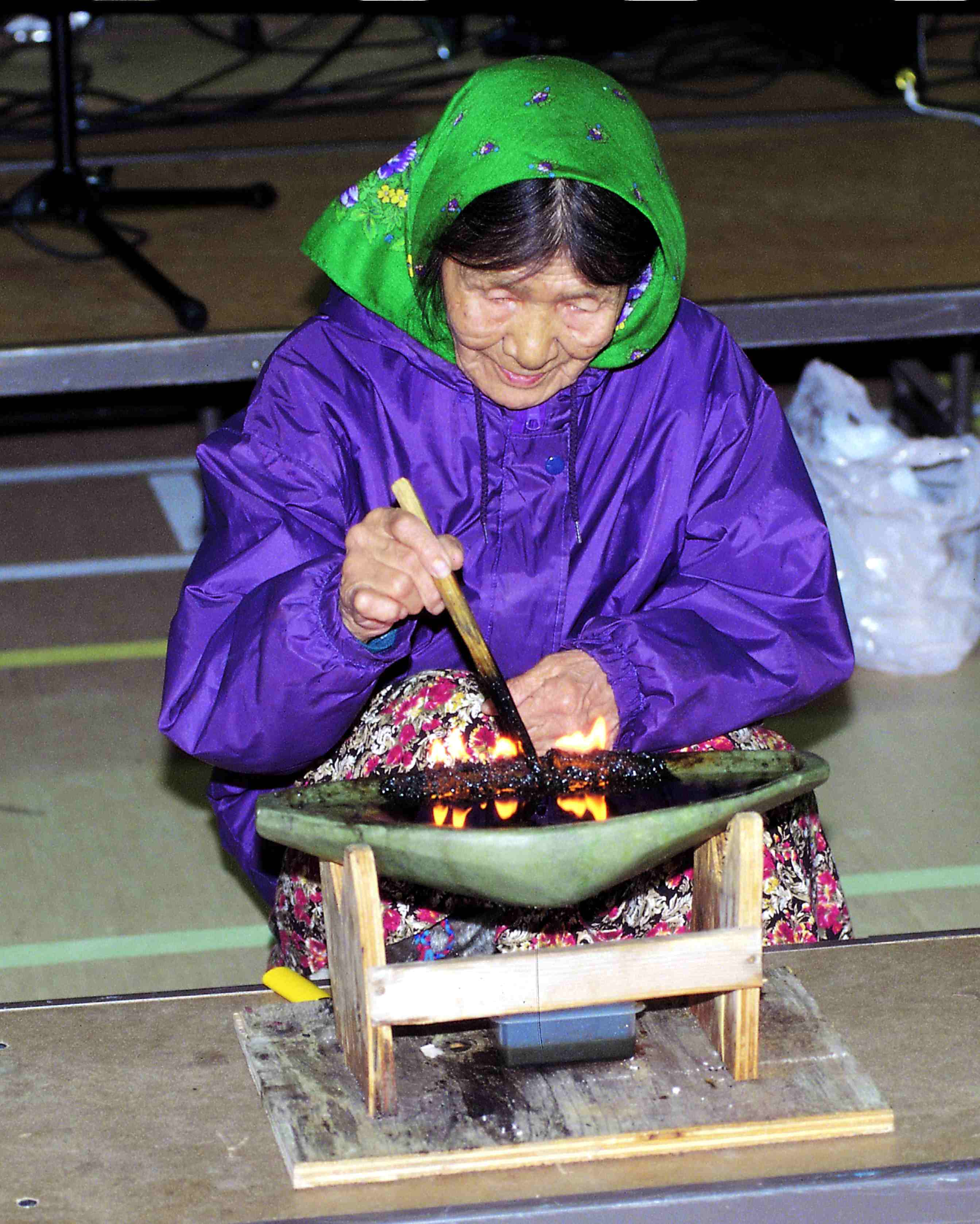
Inuit Elder tending the Qulliq, a ceremonial oil lamp made of serpentinite.

=== As an ovenstone ===
A variety of chlorite talc schist associated with Alpine serpentinite is found in Val d'Anniviers, Switzerland and was used for making "ovenstones" (German: Ofenstein), a carved stone base beneath a cast iron stove.

=== Neutron shield in nuclear reactors ===
Serpentinite has a significant amount of bound water, so it contains abundant hydrogen atoms able to slow down neutrons by elastic collision (neutron thermalization process). Because of this, serpentinite can be used as dry filler inside steel jackets in some designs of nuclear reactors. For example, in the RBMK series, as at Chernobyl, it was used for top radiation shielding to protect operators from escaping neutrons. Serpentine can also be added as aggregate to special concrete used in nuclear reactor shielding to increase the concrete density (2.6 g/cm^{3} (0.094 lb/cu in)) and its neutron capture cross section.

=== CO_{2} sequestration ===
Because it readily absorbs carbon dioxide, serpentinite may be of use for sequestering atmospheric carbon dioxide. To speed up the reaction, serpentinite may be reacted with carbon dioxide at elevated temperature in carbonation reactors. Carbon dioxide may also be reacted with alkaline mine waste from serpentine deposits, or carbon dioxide may be injected directly into underground serpentinite formations. Serpentinite may also be used as a source of magnesium in conjunction with electrolytic cells for CO_{2} scrubbing.

== Cultural references ==
It is the state rock of California, USA and the California Legislature specified that serpentine was "the official State Rock and lithologic emblem." In 2010, a bill was introduced which would have removed serpentine's special status as state rock due to it potentially containing chrysotile asbestos. The bill met with resistance from some California geologists, who noted that the chrysotile present is not hazardous unless it is mobilized in the air as dust.

== See also ==
- Hydrogen cycle – Hydrogen exchange between the living and non-living world
- Nephrite – Variety of jade
- Soapstone – Talc-bearing metamorphic rock
