= Zambales Ophiolite Complex =

Geological feature in the Philippines

Zambales Ophiolite
- Stratigraphic range: Late Jurassic to Middle Eocene~161.5–40.4 Ma
- Type: Geological formation
- Unit of: Zambales Range
- Underlies: Constitutes the basement of Zambales
- Overlies: Balog-Balog Diorite and Aksitero Formation

Lithology
- Primary: Harzburgite, lherzolite, dunite, gabbro, diabasic dike complex, diorite, pillow basalt, pelagic limestone, sandstone, mudstone,
- Other: Pumice (from nearby Mount Pinatubo)

Location
- Region: Central Luzon
- Country: Philippines

Type section
- Named for: Zambales
- Named by: Bureau of Mines and Geosciences
- Year defined: 1981

The Zambales Ophiolite Complex (also called Zambales Ophiolite) is a large, well-preserved exposure of oceanic crust located in the western portion of Luzon Island, Philippines. It is considered one of the best-preserved and most studied ophiolites, offering valuable insights into the formation and evolution of oceanic crust and the processes involved in plate tectonics.

== Composition ==
The ophiolite is composed of two distinct blocks with different ages:

- Acoje Block: This block has an age of Late Jurassic to Early Cretaceous age. It is composed of island arc tholeiite, which is a type of volcanic rock formed in an island arc setting.
- Coto Block: This block has an age of Eocene. It is composed of transitional mid-ocean ridge basalt-island arc tholeiite, which suggests that it formed in a more complex tectonic setting than the Acoje Block.

== Geological studies and significance ==
The ophiolite has been the subject of numerous geological studies, and it continues to be an important resource for understanding the formation and evolution of oceanic crust. It is also a popular destination for geotourism, offering visitors a chance to see and learn about one of the Earth's most important geological features.

== Mining operation ==
The ophiolite in the Philippines boasts abundant mineral resources, attracting interest from mining companies. Primarily targeted minerals include chromite, crucial for stainless steel, along with nickel, manganese, copper, and cobalt, valuable for various industries. Mining methods predominantly involve open-pit and underground techniques to access deposits. The complex also hosts seams that could be rich in natural hydrogen and methane generated from iron's reactions with groundwater. However, these operations are contentious due to their environmental and social ramifications. Environmental impacts encompass habitat destruction, water and air pollution, and land degradation, posing threats to biodiversity and human health. Socially, mining leads to community displacement, health risks, and disruptions to livelihoods like farming and fishing. Consequently, local communities and environmental organizations oppose mining in the ZOC, emphasizing its ecological sensitivity. Despite governmental regulations aimed at mitigating these impacts, ongoing debates persist regarding the balance between economic development and environmental preservation. As a result, some mining activities continue in the ZOC, while others face suspension or cancellation, reflecting the ongoing struggle to reconcile conflicting interests and concerns.
