= Ferro-actinolite =

Ferro-actinolite is the ferrous iron-rich endmember of the actinolite-tremolite continuous solid solution series of the double chain calcareous amphibole group of inosilicate minerals. All the series members belong to the monoclinic crystal system.

The following formula comparison indicates the position of individual well-known members within the series:

tremolite: ☐Ca_{2}(Mg_{5.0-4.5}Fe^{2+}_{0.0-0.5})Si_{8}O_{22}(OH)_{2}
actinolite: ☐Ca_{2}(Mg_{4.5-2.5}Fe^{2+}_{0.5-2.5})Si_{8}O_{22}(OH)_{2}
ferro-actinolite: ☐Ca_{2}(Mg_{2.5-0.0}Fe^{2+}_{2.5-5.0})Si_{8}O_{22}(OH)_{2}

Some other substitute cations that may replace either Ca, Mg, or Fe include potassium (K), aluminium (Al), manganese (Mn), titanium (Ti), and chromium (Cr). A fluorine (F) anion may partially replace the hydroxyl (OH).

== Physical properties ==
Ferroactinolite prisms are much darker in color than actinolite due to their higher iron content affecting opacity, but may be dark green in thin slices or around the edges. Its crystals are brittle, with a hardness of 5–6 on the Mohs scale, and have a white streak. Ferroactinolite is pleochroic and has a higher refractive index and surface relief than actinolite.
