= Forearc =

Region between an oceanic trench and associated volcanic arc

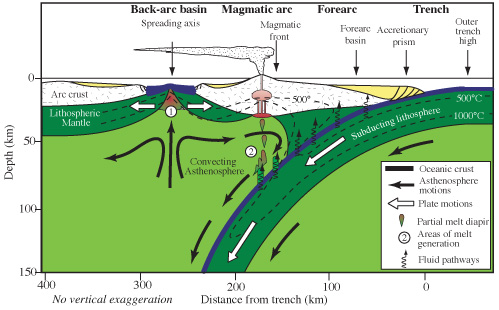
Cross-section of a subduction zone and back-arc basin. The forearc is the region between the trench and the volcanic arc.

A forearc is a region in a subduction zone between an oceanic trench and the associated volcanic arc. Forearc regions are present along convergent margins and eponymously form 'in front of' the volcanic arcs that are characteristic of convergent plate margins. A back-arc region is the companion region behind the volcanic arc.

Many forearcs have an accretionary wedge which may form a topographic ridge known as an outer arc ridge that parallels the volcanic arc. A forearc basin between the accretionary wedge and the volcanic arc can accumulate thick deposits of sediment, sometimes referred to as an outer arc trough. Due to collisional stresses as one tectonic plate subducts under another, forearc regions are sources for powerful earthquakes.

== Formation ==
During subduction, an oceanic plate is thrust below another tectonic plate, which can be oceanic or continental. Water and other volatiles in the subducting plate cause flux melting in the upper mantle, creating magma that rises and penetrates the overriding plate, forming a volcanic arc. The weight of the subducting slab flexes the overriding plate and creates an oceanic trench. This area between the trench and the arc is called the forearc region, with the area behind the arc and away from the trench known as the back-arc region.

The mantle region between the overriding plate and the subducting slab forms a wedge shape. This wedge is open-ended on the back-arc side and along its edges. The downward motion of the subducting slab will no doubt tend to pull adjacent mantle into the wedge and create mantle flow patterns within the wedge however the exact characteristics of this flow is difficult to model and poorly constrained by data. At the same time we can assume the temperature of the mantle wedge closer to the trench will be dominated by the denser and colder subducting slab, resulting in a cold, stagnant portion of the mantle wedge along its bottom.

Initial theories proposed that the oceanic trenches and magmatic arcs were the primary suppliers of the accretionary sedimentation wedges in the forearc regions. More recent discovery suggests that some of the accreted material in the forearc region is from a mantle source along with trench turbidites derived from continental material. This theory holds due to evidence of pelagic sediments and continental crust being subducted in processes known as sediment subduction and subduction erosion respectively.

Over geological time there is constant recycling of the forearc deposits due to erosion, deformation and sedimentary subduction. The material in the forearc region (accretionary prism, forearc basin and trench) cycles downwards from the subduction of the subducting plate and back upwards from the high pressure flow of water saturated rocks from deep within the collision zone. This generates a mixture of igneous, metamorphic and sedimentary rocks to form which geologists call a mélange. Note also that, while in general there is an increase in metamorphic grade from trench to arc, we surprisingly sometimes find low-grade, high-pressure facies such as blueschist and eclogite in accretion prisms at the tip of the mantle wedge. These rocks must have been carried to significant depth and kept cool by the cold subducting slab before (somehow) being uplifted. This gives us further clues as to the possible motion and mixing within the wedge. Forearc regions are also where ophiolites are emplaced should obduction occur, but such deposits are not continuous and can often be removed by erosion.

As tectonic plates converge, the closing of an ocean will result in the convergence of two landmasses, each of which is either an island arc or continental margin. When these two bodies collide, the result is orogenesis, at which time the underthrusting oceanic crust slows down. In early stages of arc-continent collision, there is uplift and erosion of the accretionary prism and forearc basin. In the later stages of collision, the forearc region may be sutured, rotated and shortened which can form syn-collisional folds and thrust belts.

== Structure ==
At the surface, the forearc region can include a forearc basin(s), outer-arc high, accretionary prism and the trench itself. The forearc subduction interface can include a seismogenic zone, where megathrust earthquakes can occur, a decoupled zone, and a viscously coupled zone.

The accretionary prism is located at the slope of the trench break where there is significantly decreased slope angle. Between the break and the magmatic arc, a sedimentary basin filled with erosive material from the volcanic arc and substrate can accumulate into a forearc basin which overlays the oldest thrust slices in the wedge of the forearc region.

In general, the forearc topography (specifically in the trench region) is trying to achieve an equilibrium between buoyancy and tectonic forces caused by subduction. Upward motion of the forearc is related to buoyancy forces and the downward motion is associated with the tectonic forcing which causes the oceanic lithosphere to descend. The relationship between surface slope and subduction thrust also plays a huge role in the variation of forearc structure and deformation. A subduction wedge can be classified as either stable with little deformation or unstable with pervasive internal deformation (see section on Models). Some common deformation in forearc sediments are synsedimentary deformation and olistostromes, such as that seen in the Magnitogorsk forearc region.

== Models ==
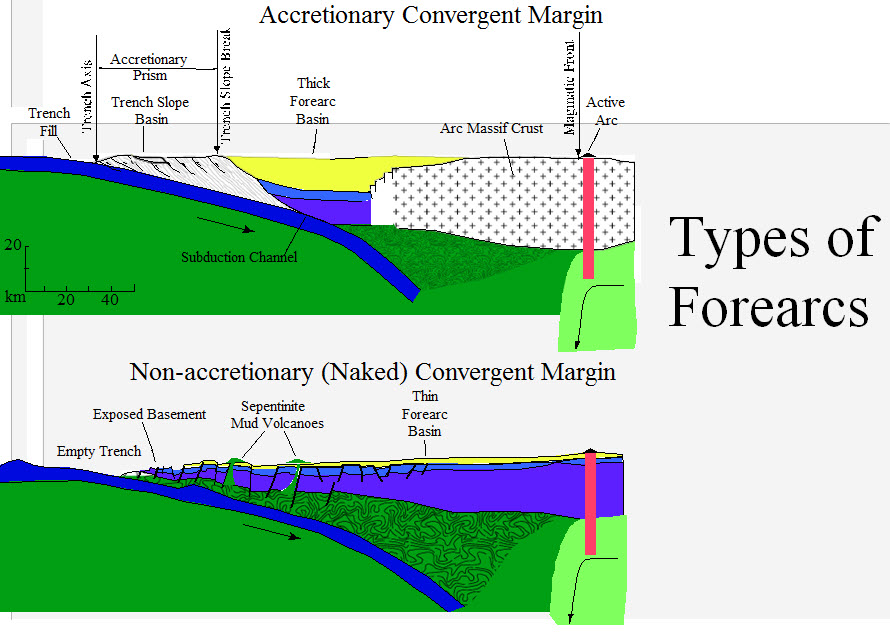
Types of forearcs

There are two models which characterize a forearc basin formation and deformation and are dependent on sediment deposition and subsidence (see figure). The first model represents a forearc basin formed with little to no sediment supply. Conversely, the second model represents a basin with a healthy sediment supply. Basin depth depends on the supply of oceanic plate sediments, continentally derived clastic material and orthogonal convergence rates. The accretionary flux (sediment supply in and out) also determines the rate at which the sedimentation wedges grow within the forearc.

The age of the oceanic crust along with the convergent velocity controls the coupling across the converging interface of the continental and oceanic crust. The strength of this coupling controls the deformation associated with the event and can be seen in the forearc region deformation signatures.

== Seismicity ==
The intense interaction between the overriding and underthrusting plates in the forearc regions have shown to evolve strong coupling mechanisms which result in megathrust earthquakes such as the Tohoku-oki earthquake which occurred off the Pacific coast of Northeast Japan (Tian and Liu. 2013). These mega thrust earthquakes may be correlated with low values of heat flow generally associated with forearc regions. Geothermal data shows a heat flow of ~30–40 mW/m^{2}, which indicates cold, strong mantle.

== Examples ==
One good example is the Mariana forearc, where scientists have done extensive research. In this setting there is an erosive margin and forearc slope which consists of 2 km high and 30 km diameter serpentine- mud volcanoes. The erosive properties of these volcanoes are consistent with the metamorphic grades (blueschists) expected for this region in the forearc. There is evidence from geothermal data and models which show the slab-mantle interface, levels of friction and the cool oceanic lithosphere at the trench. Other examples are:

- Central Andean Forearc
- Banda Forearc
- Savu-Wetar Forearc
- Luzon arc-forearc
- Tohoku Forearc
- Between Western Cordillera and Peru-Chile Trench

== See also ==
- Back-arc region
