= Tremolite =

Amphibole, double-chain inosilicate mineral

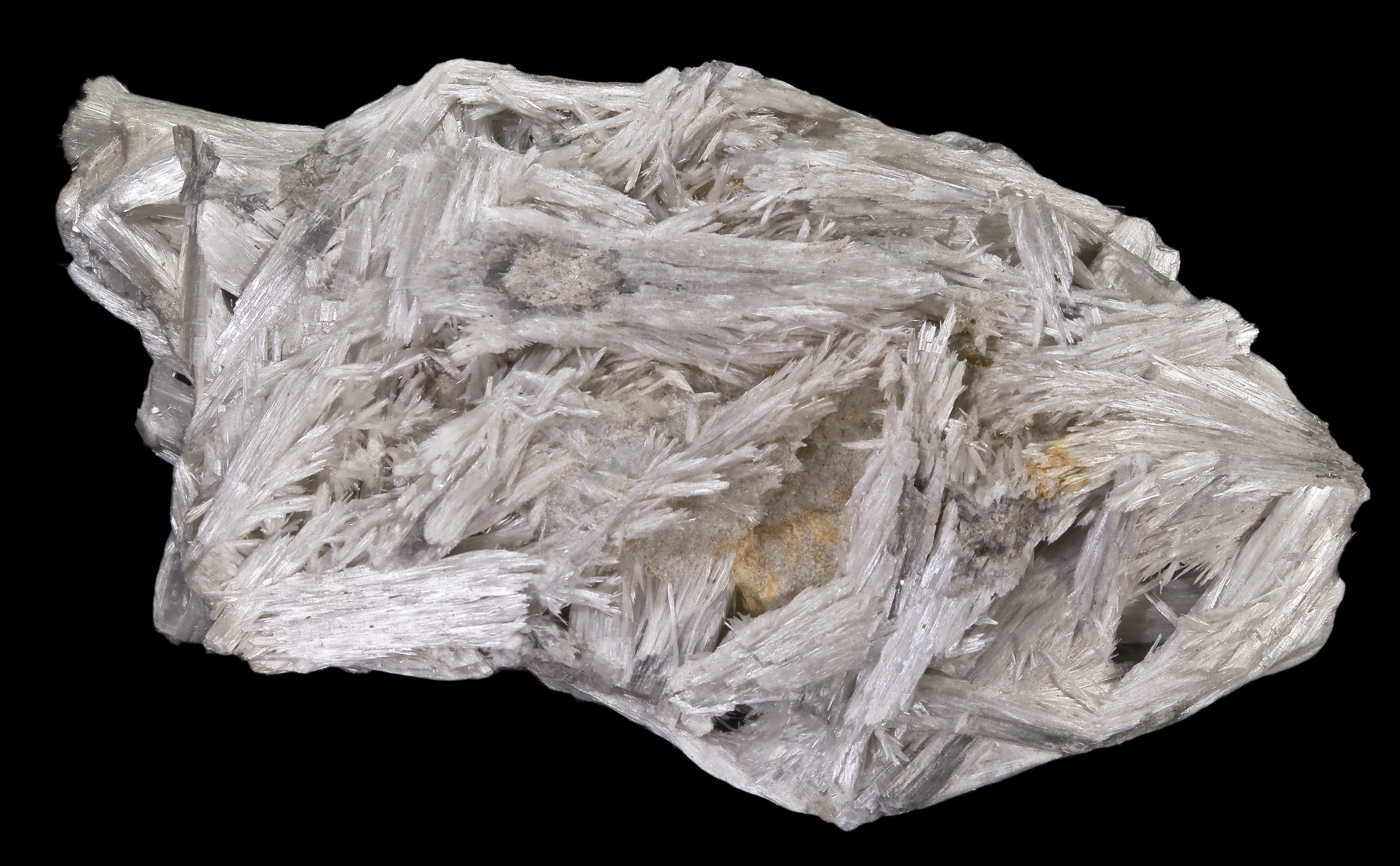

General
- Category: Inosilicates
- Formula: Ca_{2}(Mg_{5.0-4.5}Fe^{2+}_{0.0-0.5})Si_{8}O_{22}(OH)_{2}
- IMA symbol: Tr
- Strunz classification: 9.DE.10
- Crystal system: Monoclinic
- Crystal class: Prismatic (2/m) (same H-M symbol)
- Space group: C2/m (no. 12)
- Unit cell: a = 9.84 Å, b = 18.02 Å c = 5.27 Å; β = 104.95°; Z = 2

Identification
- Color: White, gray, lavender to pink, light green, light yellow
- Crystal habit: Elongated prismatic, or flattened crystals; also as fibrous, granular or columnar aggregates
- Twinning: Simple or multiple, common parallel to {100}; rarely parallel to {001}
- Cleavage: Perfect on {110} at 56° and 124°; partings on {010} and {100}
- Tenacity: Brittle
- Mohs scale hardness: 5–6
- Luster: Vitreous and silky
- Streak: White
- Diaphaneity: Transparent to translucent
- Specific gravity: 2.99–3.03
- Optical properties: Biaxial (−)
- Refractive index: n_{α} = 1.599 – 1.612 n_{β} = 1.613 – 1.626 n_{γ} = 1.625 – 1.637
- Birefringence: δ = 0.026
- 2V angle: Measured: 86° to 88°
- Ultraviolet fluorescence: Short UV=yellow, Long UV=pink

Tremolite is a member of the amphibole group of silicate minerals with composition Ca_{2}(Mg_{5.0-4.5}Fe^{2+}_{0.0-0.5})Si_{8}O_{22}(OH)_{2}. Tremolite forms by metamorphism of sediments rich in dolomite and quartz, and occurs in two distinct forms, crystals and fibers. Tremolite forms a series with actinolite and ferro-actinolite. Pure magnesium tremolite is creamy-white, but the color grades to dark green with increasing iron content. It has a hardness on Mohs scale of 5 to 6. Nephrite, one of the two minerals known as the gemstone jade, is a green crystalline variety of tremolite.

The fibrous form of tremolite is one of the six recognised types of asbestos. Inhaling asbestiform tremolite can lead to asbestosis, lung cancer and both pleural and malignant mesothelioma. Fibrous tremolite is sometimes found as a contaminant in vermiculite, chrysotile (itself a type of asbestos), and talc.

== Occurrence ==
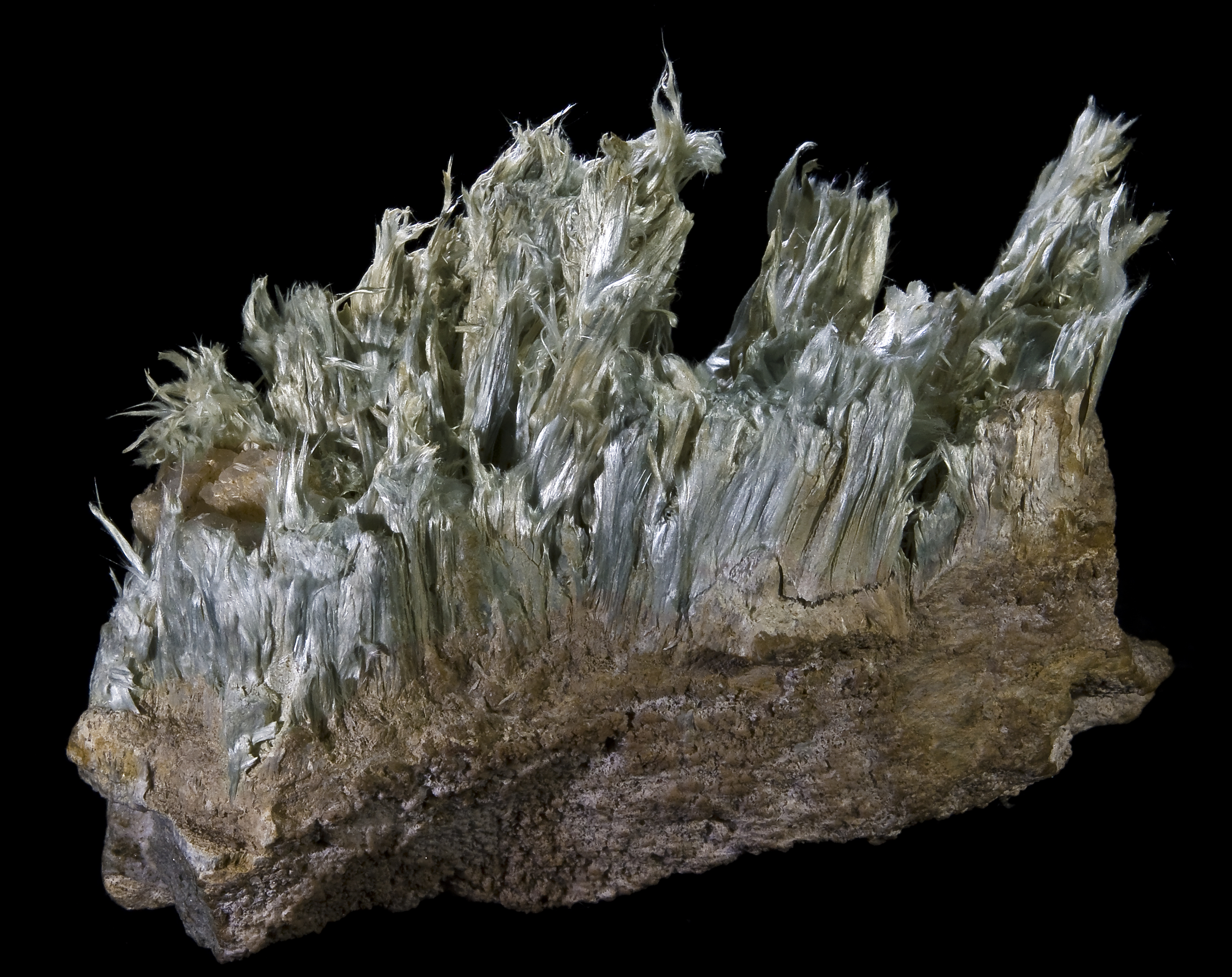
Tremolite from the Aure Valley, French Pyrenees (size: 8.2 × 6.7 cm)

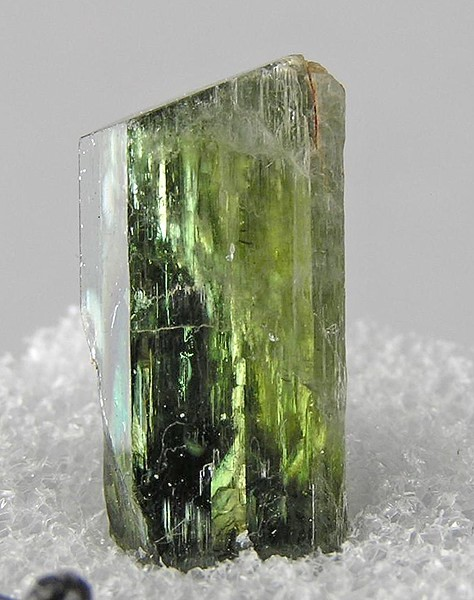
Crystalline tremolite

Asbestiform Tremolite found at Copper Creek, Virginia

Tremolite is an indicator of metamorphic grade since at high temperatures it converts to diopside.

Tremolite occurs as a result of contact metamorphism of calcium- and magnesium-rich siliceous sedimentary rocks and in greenschist facies metamorphic rocks derived from ultramafic or magnesium carbonate bearing rocks. Associated minerals include calcite, dolomite, grossular, wollastonite, talc, diopside, forsterite, cummingtonite, riebeckite, and winchite.

Tremolite was first described in 1789 for an occurrence in Campolungo, Piumogna Valley, Leventina, Ticino (Tessin), Switzerland.

== Fibrous tremolite ==
One of the six recognized types of asbestos, approximately 40,200 tons of tremolite asbestos is mined annually in India. It is otherwise found as a contaminant.

== See also ==
- Libby, Montana – location of asbestos-related ailments caused by tremolite
