= Actinolite =

Mineral

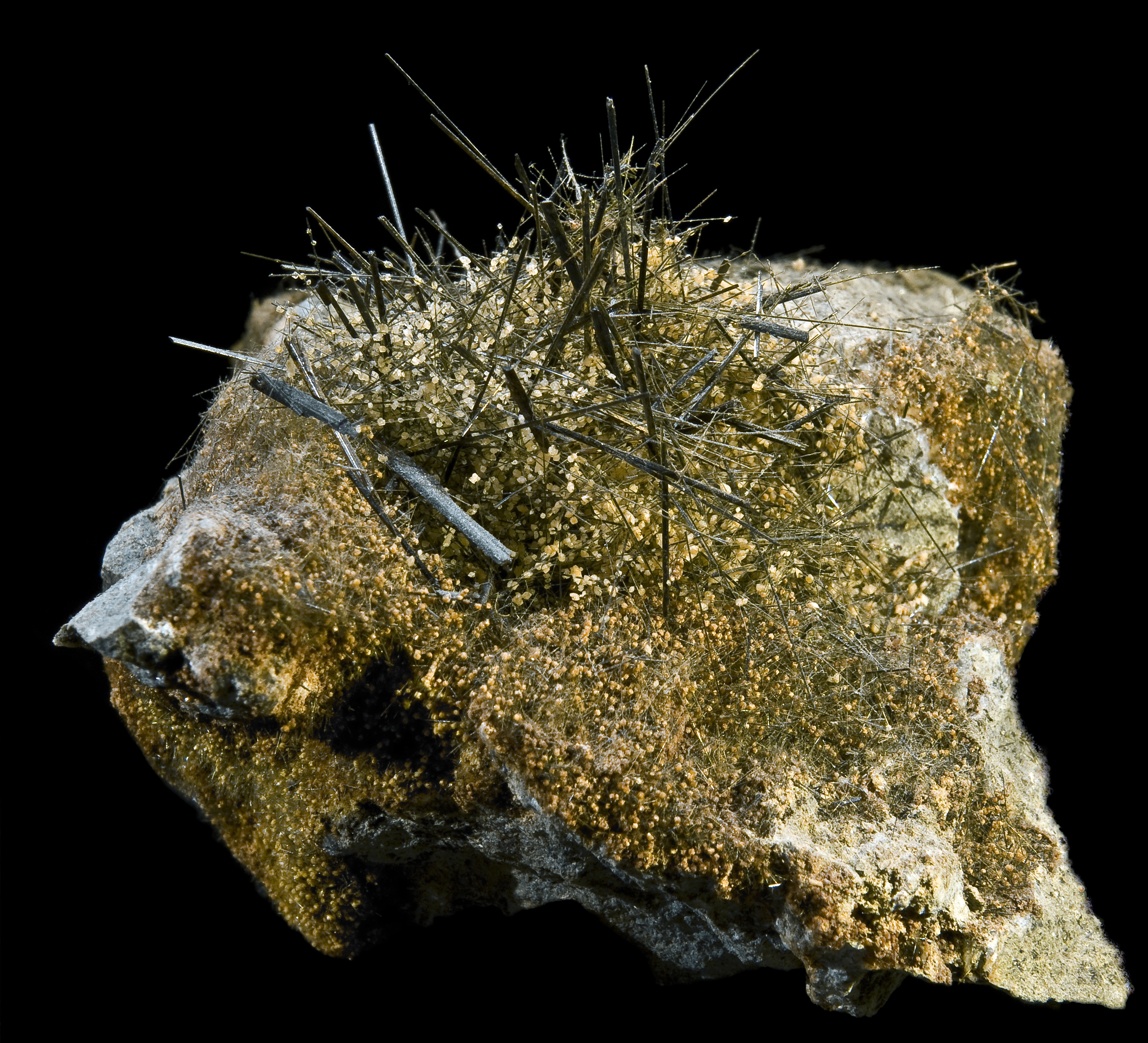
- Actinolite crystal from Portugal

General
- Category: Inosilicates
- Formula: Ca_{2}(Mg_{4.5-2.5}Fe^{2+}_{0.5-2.5}); Si_{8}O_{22}(OH)_{2}
- IMA symbol: Act
- Strunz classification: 9.DE.10
- Crystal system: Monoclinic
- Crystal class: Prismatic (2/m) (same H-M symbol)
- Space group: C2/m

Identification
- Color: pale to dark green, yellowish green, blue and black. White or grey when in asbestos
- Crystal habit: bladed, fibrous, radial
- Twinning: simple or lamellar
- Cleavage: perfect along {110}.
- Fracture: uneven
- Mohs scale hardness: 5–6
- Luster: vitreous to dull
- Streak: white
- Diaphaneity: translucent to transparent
- Specific gravity: 3.00 (+0.10, -0.05)
- Polish luster: vitreous
- Optical properties: Biaxial (−)
- Refractive index: n_{α} = 1.613–1.628 n_{β} = 1.627–1.644 n_{γ} = 1.638–1.655
- Birefringence: 0.0250–0.0270
- Pleochroism: moderate, yellow to dark green (in stones that are transparent)
- 2V angle: 78–82° (calc), 84–73° (meas)
- Dispersion: r < v
- Ultraviolet fluorescence: inert
- Absorption spectra: faint line at 503 nm

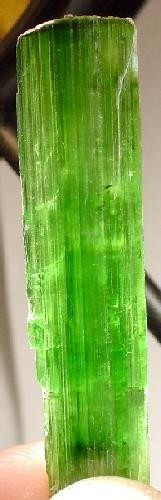
Gem-quality actinolite blade, from Mogok, Burma

Actinolite is an amphibole silicate mineral with the chemical formula Ca_{2}(Mg_{4.5–2.5}Fe^{2+}_{0.5–2.5})Si_{8}O_{22}(OH)_{2}.

== Etymology ==
The name actinolite is derived from the Greek word aktis (ἀκτίς), meaning "beam" or "ray", because of the mineral's fibrous nature.

== Mineralogy ==
Actinolite is an intermediate member in a solid-solution series between magnesium-rich tremolite, Ca_{2}(Mg_{5.0-4.5}Fe^{2+}_{0.0-0.5})Si_{8}O_{22}(OH)_{2}, and iron-rich ferro-actinolite, ☐Ca_{2}(Mg_{2.5-0.0}Fe^{2+}_{2.5-5.0})Si_{8}O_{22}(OH)_{2}. Mg and Fe ions can be freely exchanged in the crystal structure. Like tremolite, asbestiform actinolite is regulated as asbestos.

== Occurrence ==
Actinolite is commonly found in metamorphic rocks, such as contact aureoles surrounding cooled intrusive igneous rocks. It also occurs as a product of metamorphism of magnesium-rich limestones.

The old mineral name uralite is at times applied to an alteration product of primary pyroxene by a mixture composed largely of actinolite. The metamorphosed gabbro or diabase rock bodies, referred to as epidiorite, contain a considerable amount of this uralitic alteration.

Fibrous actinolite is one of the six recognised types of asbestos, the fibres being so small that they can enter the lungs and damage the alveoli. Actinolite asbestos was once mined along Jones Creek at Gundagai, Australia.

== Gemology ==
Some forms of actinolite are used as gemstones. One is nephrite, one of the two types of jade (the other being jadeite, a variety of pyroxene).

Another gem variety is the chatoyant form known as cat's-eye actinolite. This stone is translucent to opaque, and green to yellowish green color. This variety has had the misnomer jade cat's-eye. Transparent actinolite is rare and is faceted for gem collectors. Major sources for these forms of actinolite are Taiwan and Canada. Other sources are Madagascar, Tanzania, and the United States.

== See also ==
- Classification of minerals
- List of minerals
