= Gleysol =

Saturated soil type

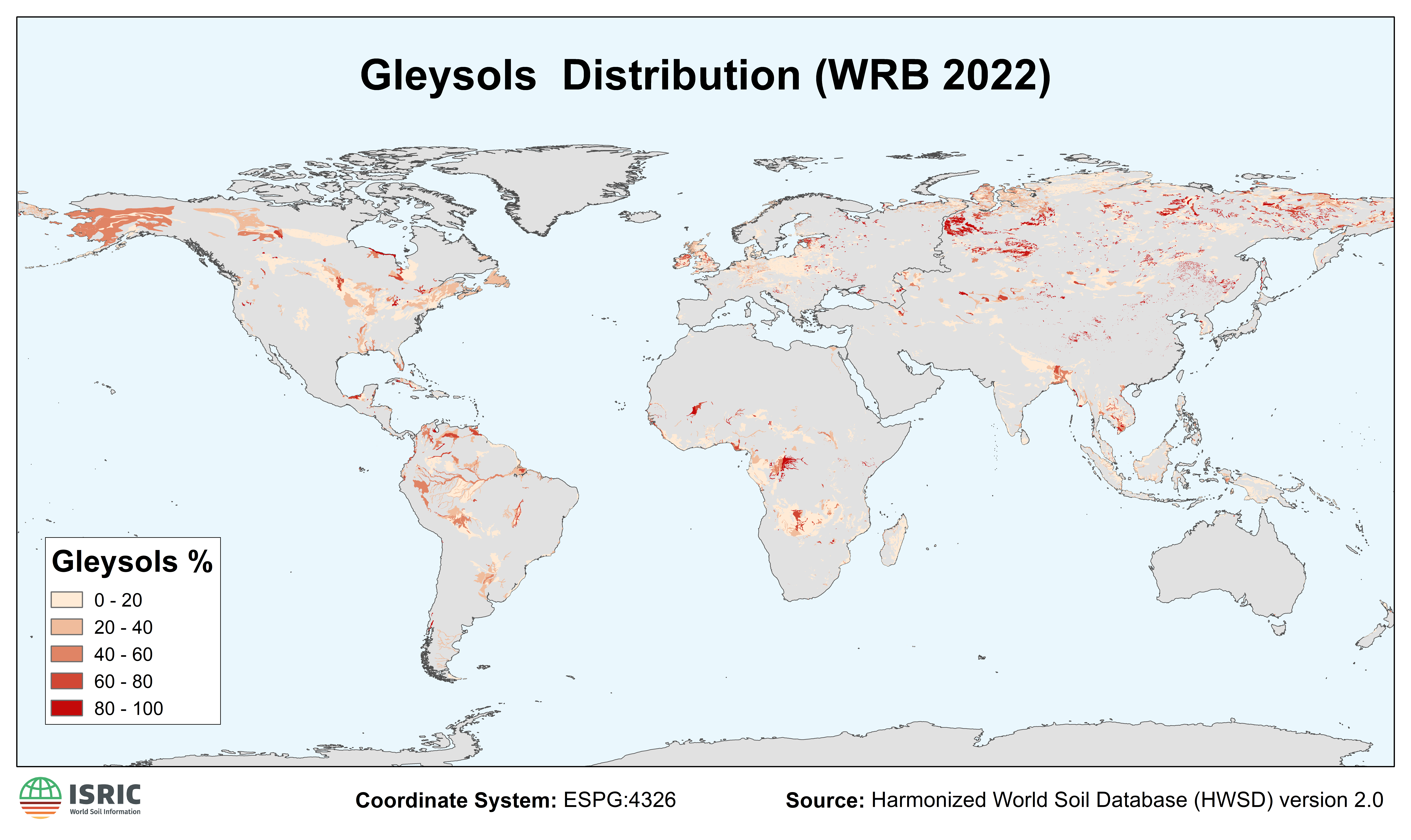
Distribution of Gleysols

A gleysol or gley soil is a hydric soil that unless drained is saturated with groundwater for long enough to develop a characteristic gleyic colour pattern. The pattern is essentially made up of reddish, brownish, or yellowish colours at surfaces of soil particles and/or in the upper soil horizons mixed with greyish/blueish colours inside the peds and/or deeper in the soil. Gleysols are also known as Gleyzems, meadow soils, Aqu-suborders of Entisols, Inceptisols and Mollisols (USDA soil taxonomy), or as groundwater soils and hydro-morphic soils.

The term gley, or glei, is derived from Ukrainian: глей, romanized: hlei, and was introduced into scientific terminology in 1905 by the Ukrainian scientist Georgy Vysotsky.

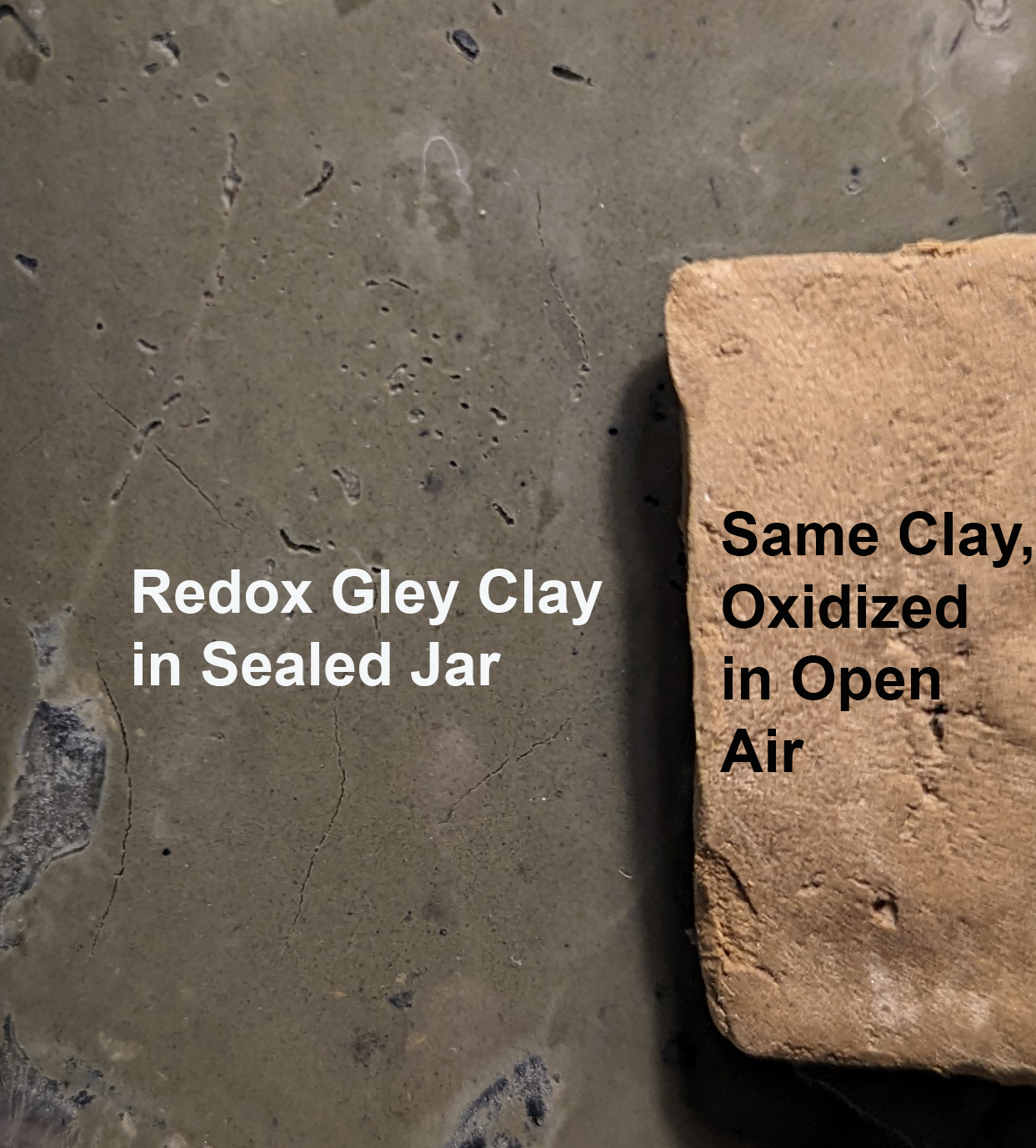
The clay on the right is exposed to air and is oxidized a reddish hue. The clay on the left is identical, but sealed in a glass jar for two weeks in an anaerobic setting, causing redox and color change to gley.

Gleysols occur within a wide range of unconsolidated materials, mainly fluvial, marine and lacustrine sediments of Pleistocene or Holocene age, having basic to acidic mineralogy. They are found in depression areas and low landscape positions with shallow groundwater.

Wetness is the main limitation on agriculture of virgin gleysols; these are covered with natural swamp vegetation and lie idle or are used for extensive grazing. Farmers use artificially-drained gleysols for arable cropping, dairy farming and horticulture. Gleysols in the tropics and subtropics are widely planted with rice.

Gleysols occupy an estimated 720 million hectares worldwide. They are azonal soils and occur in nearly all climates. The largest extent of Gleysols is in northern Russia, Siberia, Canada, Alaska, China and Bangladesh. An estimated 200 million hectares of gleysols are found in the tropics, mainly in the Amazon region, equatorial Africa, and the coastal swamps of Southeast Asia.

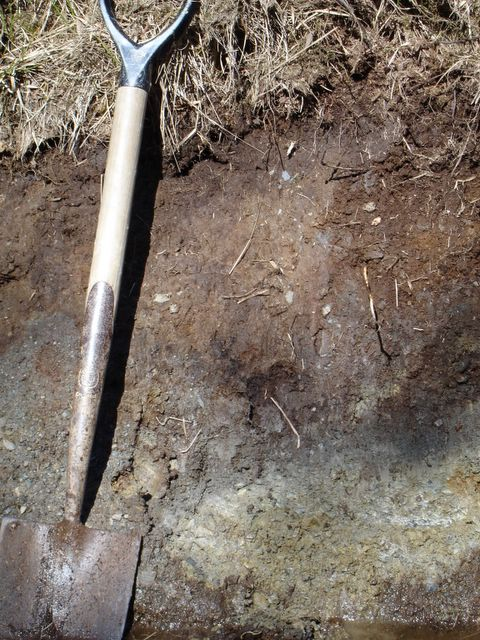
A stagnohumic gleysoil in a forest plantation in Mid-Wales, United Kingdom. The organic-rich topsoil is over a grey and orange mottled subsoil developed in glacial till ("boulder clay").

They exhibit a greenish-blue-grey soil color because of anoxic wetland conditions. On exposure, as the iron in the soil oxidizes colors are transformed to a mottled pattern of reddish, yellow or orange patches. During soil formation (gleying), the oxygen supply in the soil profile is restricted due to soil moisture at saturation. Anaerobic micro-organisms support cellular respiration by using alternatives to free oxygen as electron acceptors to support cellular respiration. Where anaerobic organisms reduce ferric oxide to ferrous oxide, the reduced mineral compounds produce the typical gleysoil color. Green rust, a layered double hydroxide (LDH) of Fe(II) and Fe(III) can be found as the mineral fougerite in gleysoils.

Gleysoils may be sticky and hard to work, especially where the gleying is caused by surface water held up on a slowly permeable layer. However, some ground-water gley soils have permeable lower horizons, including, for example, some sands in hollows within sand dune systems (known as slacks), and in some alluvial situations.

Groundwater gleysoils develop where drainage is poor because the water table (phreatic surface) is high, whilst surface-water gleying occurs when precipitation input at the surface does not drain freely through the ground. A reducing environment exists in the saturated layers, which become mottled greyish-blue or greyish-brown due to its ferrous iron and organic matter content. The presence of reddish or orange mottles indicates localised re-oxidation of ferrous salts in the soil matrix, and is often associated with root channels, animal burrows, or cracking of the soil material during dry spells.

In the World Reference Base for Soil Resources (WRB), soils with redox processes due to ascending groundwater belong to the Reference Soil Group Gleysols. Soils with redox processes due to stagnant water are Stagnosols and Planosols.

== See also ==
- Pedogenesis
- Pedology (soil study)
- Soil classification
- Anaerobic respiration
- Fougerite, the natural form of green rust
- Blue goo
- Redox
- Redox gradient
