= Dronino =

Dronino may refer to:

- Dronino meteorite, an iron meteorite found in Russia in 2000
- Dronino (Ryazan), a village in Ryazan oblast, Russia
