= Iron(II,III) oxide =

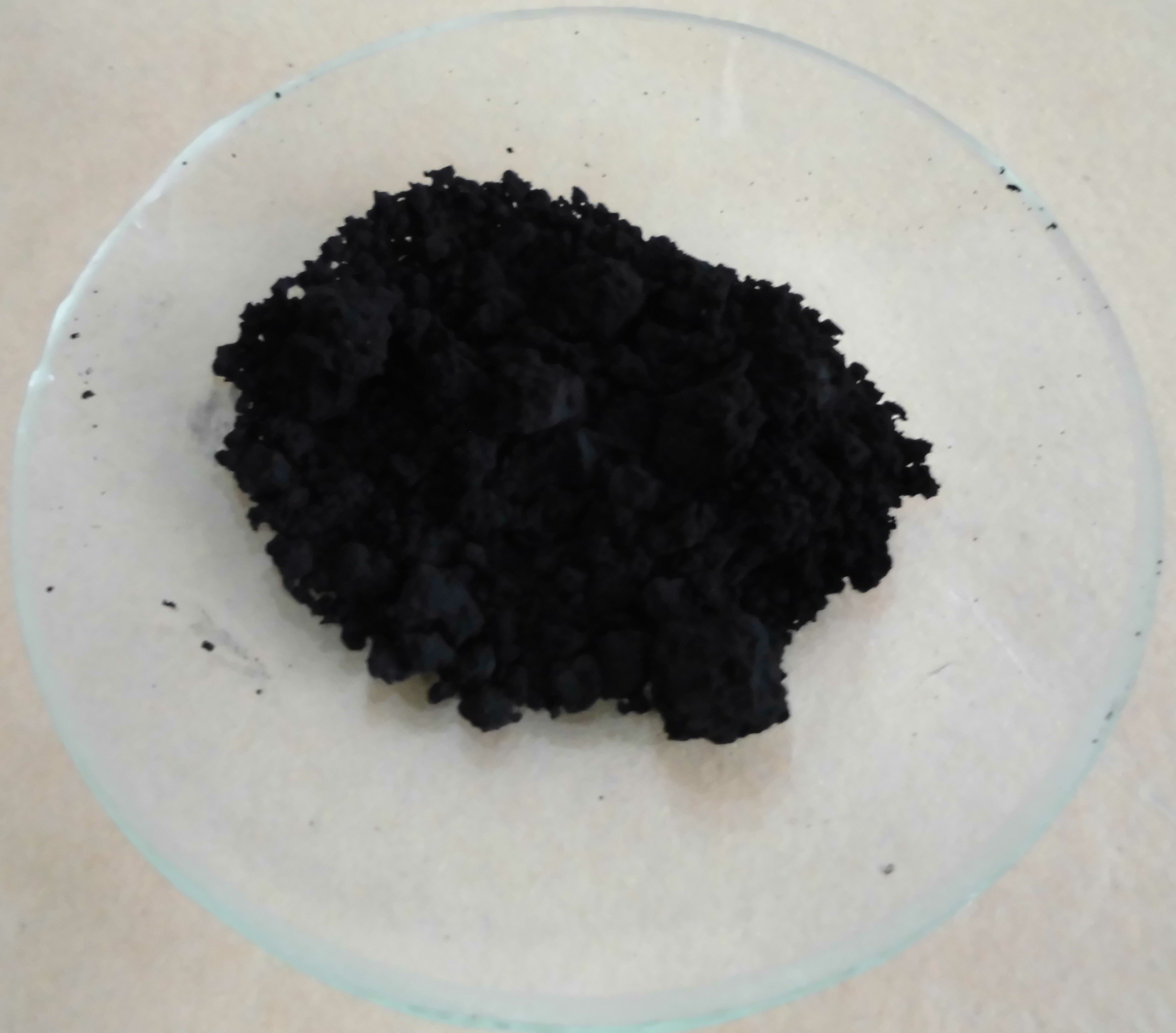

Names
- IUPAC name iron(II) diiron(III) oxide
- Other names: Ferrous ferric oxide; Ferrosoferric oxide; Iron(II,III) oxide; Magnetite; Black iron oxide; Lodestone; Rust; Mars black; Pigment Black 11

Identifiers
CAS Number	1317-61-9
3D model (JSmol)	Interactive image; Interactive image
ChEBI	CHEBI:50821
ChEMBL	ChEMBL1201867
ChemSpider	17215625
ECHA InfoCard	100.013.889
PubChem CID	16211978
UNII	XM0M87F357
CompTox Dashboard (EPA)	DTXSID5029639
- InChI: InChI=1S/3Fe.4O Key: SZVJSHCCFOBDDC-UHFFFAOYSA-N; InChI=1/3Fe.4O/rFe3O4/c1-4-2-6-3(5-1)7-2 Key: SZVJSHCCFOBDDC-QXRQKJBKAR
- SMILES: O1[Fe]2O[Fe]O[Fe]1O2; O=[Fe]O[Fe]O[Fe]=O

Properties
Chemical formula	Fe_{3}O_{4}; FeO·Fe_{2}O_{3}
Molar mass	231.533 g/mol
Appearance	solid black powder
Density	5 g/cm^{3}
Melting point	1,597 °C (2,907 °F; 1,870 K)
Boiling point	2,623 °C (4,753 °F; 2,896 K)
Refractive index (n_{D})	2.42

Hazards
NFPA 704 (fire diamond)	0 0 1 OX

Thermochemistry
Std enthalpy of formation (Δ_{f}H^{⦵}_{298})	−1120.89 kJ·mol^{−1}
- Except where otherwise noted, data are given for materials in their standard state (at 25 °C [77 °F], 100 kPa). Infobox references

Iron(II,III) oxide, or black iron oxide, is the chemical compound with formula Fe_{3}O_{4}. It occurs in nature as the mineral magnetite. It is one of a number of iron oxides, the others being iron(II) oxide (FeO), which is rare, and iron(III) oxide (Fe_{2}O_{3}) which also occurs naturally as the mineral hematite. It contains both Fe^{2+} and Fe^{3+} ions and is sometimes formulated as FeO·Fe_{2}O_{3}. This iron oxide is encountered in the laboratory as a black powder. It exhibits permanent magnetism and is ferrimagnetic, but is sometimes incorrectly described as ferromagnetic. Its most extensive use is as a black pigment (see: Mars Black). For this purpose, it is synthesized rather than being extracted from the naturally occurring mineral as the particle size and shape can be varied by the method of production.

== Properties ==
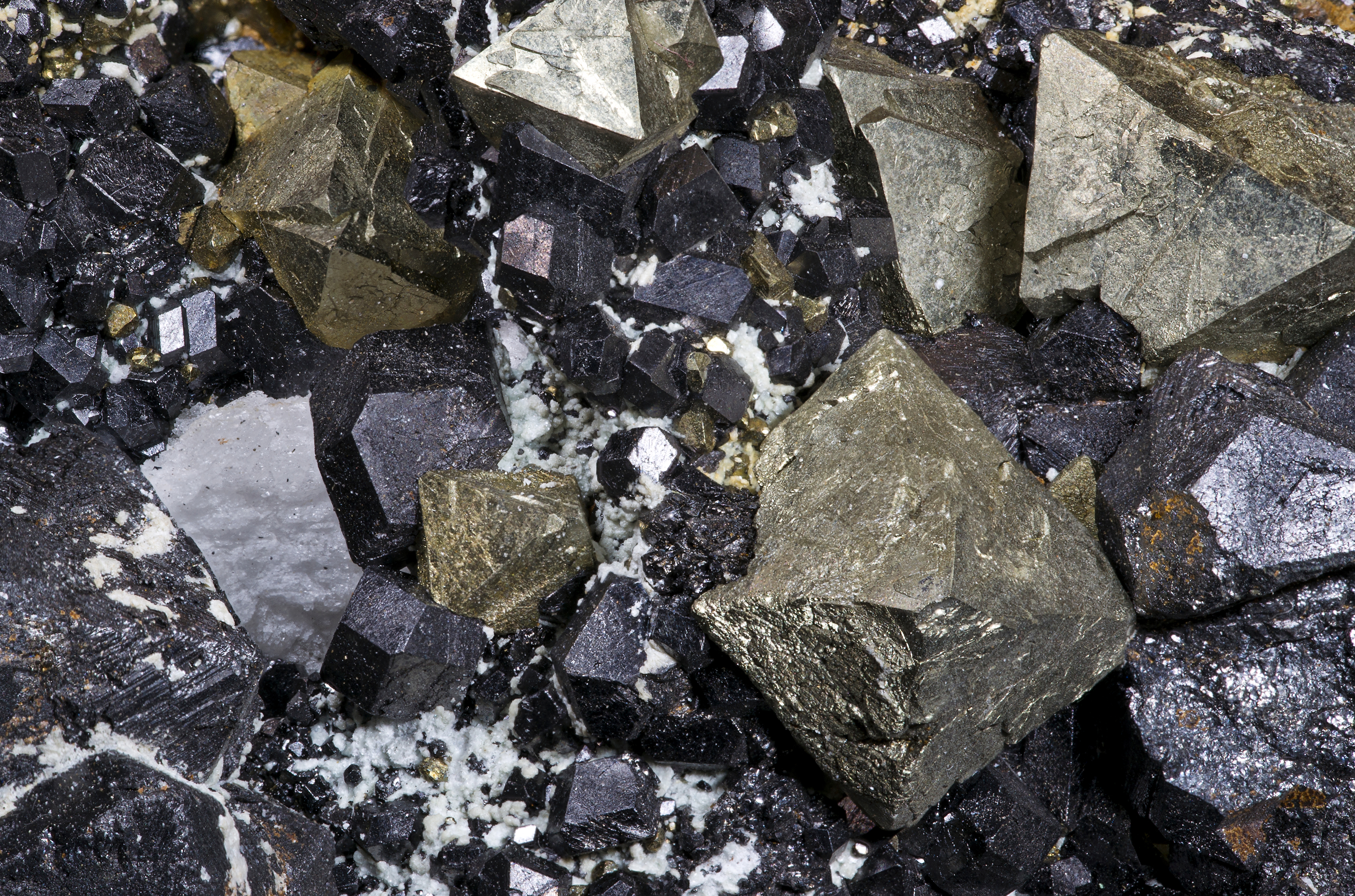
Sample of magnetite, naturally occurring Fe_{3}O_{4}.

Fe_{3}O_{4} is ferrimagnetic with a Curie temperature of 858 K (585 °C). There is a phase transition at 120 K (−153 °C), called Verwey transition where there is a discontinuity in the structure, conductivity and magnetic properties. This effect has been extensively investigated and whilst various explanations have been proposed, it does not appear to be fully understood.

While it has much higher electrical resistivity than iron metal (96.1 nΩ m), Fe_{3}O_{4}'s electrical resistivity (0.3 mΩ m) is significantly lower than that of Fe_{2}O_{3} (approx kΩ m). This is ascribed to electron exchange between the Fe^{II} and Fe^{III} centres in Fe_{3}O_{4}.

== Structure ==
Fe_{3}O_{4} has a cubic inverse spinel group structure which consists of a cubic close packed array of oxide ions where all of the Fe^{2+} ions occupy half of the octahedral sites and the Fe^{3+} are split evenly across the remaining octahedral sites and the tetrahedral sites.

Both FeO and γ-Fe_{2}O_{3} have a similar cubic close packed array of oxide ions and this accounts for the ready interchangeability between the three compounds on oxidation and reduction as these reactions entail a relatively small change to the overall structure. Fe_{3}O_{4} samples can be non-stoichiometric.

The ferrimagnetism of Fe_{3}O_{4} arises because the electron spins of the Fe^{II} and Fe^{III} ions in the octahedral sites are coupled and the spins of the Fe^{III} ions in the tetrahedral sites are coupled but anti-parallel to the former. The net effect is that the magnetic contributions of both sets are not balanced and there is a permanent magnetism.

In the molten state, experimentally constrained models show that the iron ions are coordinated to 5 oxygen ions on average. There is a distribution of coordination sites in the liquid state, with the majority of both Fe^{II} and Fe^{III} being 5-coordinated to oxygen and minority populations of both 4- and 6-fold coordinated iron.

== Preparation ==
Heated iron metal interacts with steam to form iron oxide and hydrogen gas.

$$\ce{3Fe + 4H2O->Fe3O4 + 4H2}$$

Under anaerobic conditions, ferrous hydroxide (Fe(OH)_{2}) can be oxidized by water to form magnetite and molecular hydrogen. This process is described by the Schikorr reaction:

$$\ce{\underset{ferrous\ hydroxide}{3Fe(OH)2} -> \underset{magnetite}{Fe3O4} + \underset{hydrogen}{H2} + \underset{water}{2H2O}}$$

This works because crystalline magnetite (Fe_{3}O_{4}) is thermodynamically more stable than amorphous ferrous hydroxide (Fe(OH)_{2} ).

The Massart method of preparation of magnetite as a ferrofluid, is convenient in the laboratory: mix iron(II) chloride and iron(III) chloride in the presence of sodium hydroxide.

A more efficient method of preparing magnetite without troublesome residues of sodium, is to use ammonia to promote chemical co-precipitation from the iron chlorides: first mix solutions of 0.1 M FeCl_{3}·6H_{2}O and FeCl_{2}·4H_{2}O with vigorous stirring at about 2000 rpm. The molar ratio of the FeCl_{3}:FeCl_{2} should be about 2:1. Heat the mix to 70 °C, then raise the speed of stirring to about 7500 rpm and quickly add a solution of NH_{4}OH (10 volume %). A dark precipitate of nanoparticles of magnetite forms immediately.

In both methods, the precipitation reaction relies on rapid transformation of acidic iron ions into the spinel iron oxide structure at pH 10 or higher.

Controlling the formation of magnetite nanoparticles presents challenges: the reactions and phase transformations necessary for the creation of the magnetite spinel structure are complex. The subject is of practical importance because magnetite particles are of interest in bioscience applications such as magnetic resonance imaging (MRI), in which iron oxide magnetite nanoparticles potentially present a non-toxic alternative to the gadolinium-based contrast agents currently in use. However, difficulties in controlling the formation of the particles, still frustrate the preparation of superparamagnetic magnetite particles, that is to say: magnetite nanoparticles with a coercivity of 0 A/m, meaning that they completely lose their permanent magnetisation in the absence of an external magnetic field. The smallest values currently reported for nanosized magnetite particles is Hc = 8.5 A m^{−1}, whereas the largest reported magnetization value is 87 Am^{2} kg^{−1} for synthetic magnetite.

Pigment quality Fe_{3}O_{4}, so called synthetic magnetite, can be prepared using processes that use industrial wastes, scrap iron or solutions containing iron salts (e.g. those produced as by-products in industrial processes such as the acid vat treatment (pickling) of steel):

- Oxidation of Fe metal in the Laux process where nitrobenzene is treated with iron metal using FeCl_{2} as a catalyst to produce aniline:

C_{6}H_{5}NO_{2} + 3 Fe + 2 H_{2}O → C_{6}H_{5}NH_{2} + Fe_{3}O_{4}

- Oxidation of Fe^{II} compounds, e.g. the precipitation of iron(II) salts as hydroxides followed by oxidation by aeration where careful control of the pH determines the oxide produced.

Reduction of Fe_{2}O_{3} with hydrogen:

3Fe_{2}O_{3} + H_{2} → 2Fe_{3}O_{4} +H_{2}O

Reduction of Fe_{2}O_{3} with CO:

3Fe_{2}O_{3} + CO → 2Fe_{3}O_{4} + CO_{2}

Production of nano-particles can be performed chemically by taking for example mixtures of Fe^{II} and Fe^{III} salts and mixing them with alkali to precipitate colloidal Fe_{3}O_{4}. The reaction conditions are critical to the process and determine the particle size.

Iron(II) carbonate can also be thermally decomposed into Iron(II,III):

3FeCO_{3} → Fe_{3}O_{4} + 2CO_{2} + CO

== Uses ==
Fe_{3}O_{4} is used as a black pigment and is known as C.I pigment black 11 (C.I. No.77499) or Mars Black.

Fe_{3}O_{4} is used as a catalyst in the Haber process and in the water-gas shift reaction. The latter uses an HTS (high temperature shift catalyst) of iron oxide stabilised by chromium oxide. This iron–chrome catalyst is reduced at reactor start up to generate Fe_{3}O_{4} from α-Fe_{2}O_{3} and Cr_{2}O_{3} to CrO_{3}.

=== Medical uses ===
Ferumoxytol
Clinical data
- Trade names: Feraheme, Rienso
- AHFS/Drugs.com: Monograph
- MedlinePlus: a614023
- License data: US DailyMed: Ferumoxytol
- Routes of administration: Intravenous infusion
- ATC code: None

Legal status
- Legal status: US: ℞-only; EU: Rx-only

Identifiers
- IUPAC name: iron(2+);iron(3+);oxygen(2-)
- CAS Number: 1309-38-2
- DrugBank: DB06215
- UNII: CLH5FT6412
- KEGG: D04177
- ChEBI: CHEBI:46726
- CompTox Dashboard (EPA): DTXSID5029639
- ECHA InfoCard: 100.013.889

Chemical and physical data
- Formula: Fe_{3}O_{4}
- Molar mass: 231.531 g·mol^{−1}
- 3D model (JSmol): Interactive image
- SMILES: [O-2].[O-2].[O-2].[O-2].[Fe+2].[Fe+3].[Fe+3]
- InChI: InChI=1S/3Fe.4O/q+2;2*+3;4*-2; Key:WTFXARWRTYJXII-UHFFFAOYSA-N

Nano particles of Fe_{3}O_{4} are used as contrast agents in MRI scanning.

Ferumoxytol, sold under the brand names Feraheme and Rienso, is an intravenous Fe_{3}O_{4} preparation for treatment of anemia resulting from chronic kidney disease. Ferumoxytol is manufactured and globally distributed by AMAG Pharmaceuticals.

== Reactions ==
Reduction of magnetite ore by CO in a blast furnace is used to produce iron as part of steel production process:

$$\ce{Fe3O4 + 4CO -> 3Fe + 4CO2}$$

Controlled oxidation of Fe_{3}O_{4} is used to produce brown pigment quality γ-Fe_{2}O_{3} (maghemite):

$$\ce{\underbrace{2Fe3O4}_{magnetite} + {1/2O2} ->}\ {\color{Brown}\ce{\underbrace{3(\gamma-Fe2O3)}_{maghemite}}}$$

More vigorous calcining (roasting in air) gives red pigment quality α-Fe_{2}O_{3} (hematite):

$$\ce{\underbrace{2Fe3O4}_{magnetite} + {1/2O2} ->}\ {\color{BrickRed}\ce{\underbrace{3(\alpha-Fe2O3)}_{hematite}}}$$

== Biological occurrence ==
Magnetite has been found as nano-crystals in magnetotactic bacteria (42–45 nm) and in the beak tissue of homing pigeons.
