= Fougèrite =

Hydrotalcite group mineral (green rust)

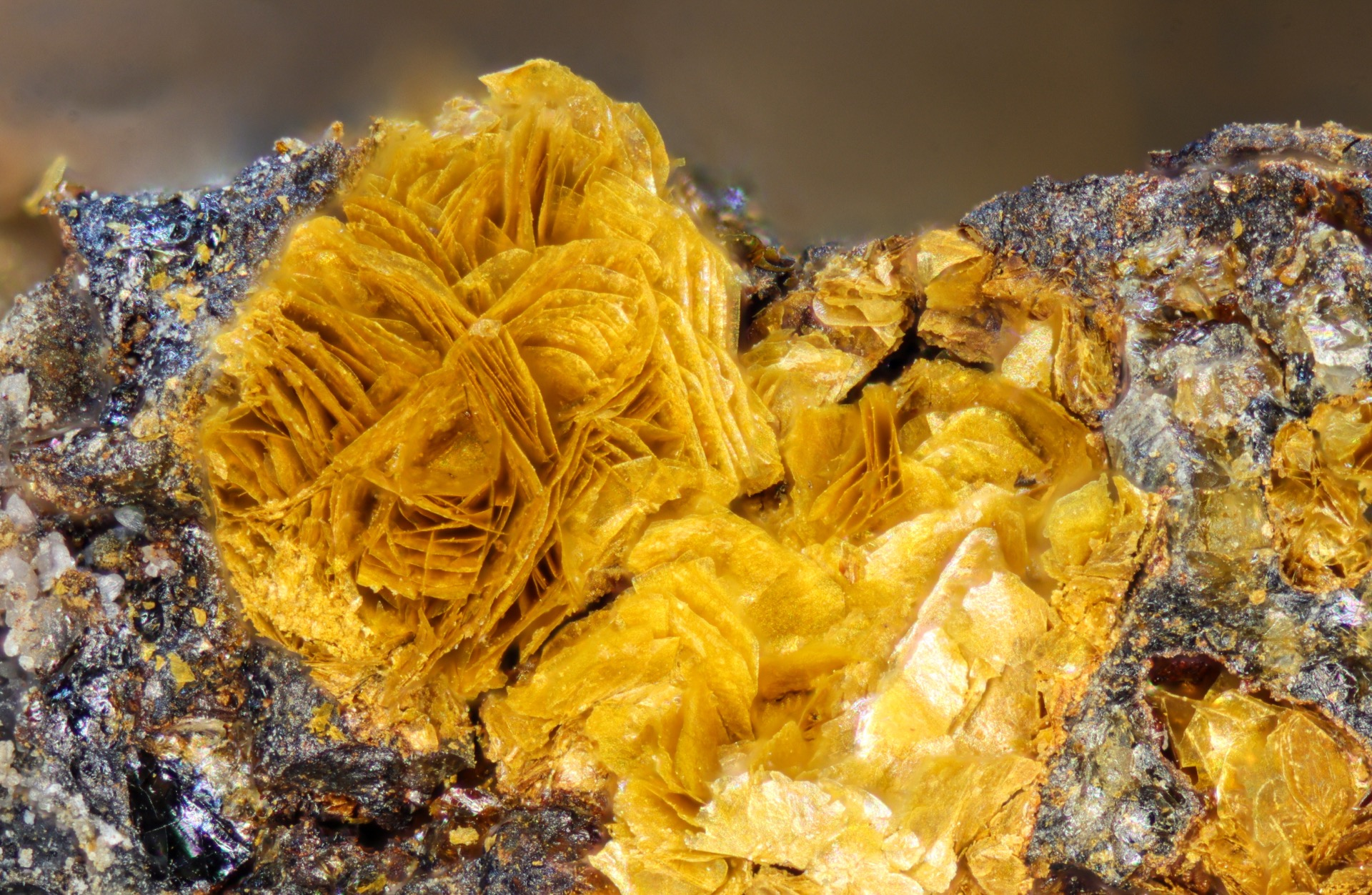

General
- Category: Hydroxide mineral
- Formula: [Fe^{2+}_{4}Fe^{3+}_{2}(OH)_{12}][CO_{3}]·3H_{2}O
- IMA symbol: Fgè
- Strunz classification: 4.FL.05
- Crystal system: Trigonal
- Crystal class: 3̅m (3̅ 2/m) – Hexagonal scalenohedral
- Space group: R3̅m
- Unit cell: a = 3.125 Å, c = 22.5 Å

Identification
- Colour: Bluish green
- Luster: Earthy
- Diaphaneity: Opaque
- Alters to: Unstable – alters to goethite or limonite

Fougèrite is a relatively recently described naturally occurring green rust mineral. It is the archetype of the fougèrite group in the larger hydrotalcite supergroup of naturally occurring layered double hydroxides. The structure is based on brucite-like layers containing Fe^{2+} and Fe^{3+} cations, O^{2−} and OH^{−} anions, with loosely bound [CO_{3}]^{2−} groups and H_{2}O molecules between the layers. Fougèrite crystallizes in trigonal system. The ideal formula for fougèrite is [Fe^{2+}_{4}Fe^{3+}_{2}(OH)_{12}][CO_{3}]·3H_{2}O. Higher degrees of oxidation produce the other members of the fougèrite group, namely trébeurdenite, [Fe^{2+}_{2}Fe^{3+}_{4}O_{2}(OH)_{10}][CO_{3}]·3H_{2}O and mössbauerite, [Fe^{3+}_{6}O_{4}(OH)_{8}][CO_{3}]·3H_{2}O.

Fougèrite was first found in forested soils near Fougères, Brittany, France, and recognised as a valid mineral species by the International Mineralogical Association in 2002. It is blue-green to bluish-gray in colour, and resembles clay minerals in habit, forming hexagonal platelets of submicron diameter. In this environment, it is intimately intergrown with trébeurdenite, to give varying overall ratios of Fe^{2+}:Fe^{3+}. The existence of two intergrown fixed-composition phases has been demonstrated by Mössbauer spectroscopy. The mineral is unstable in air, and decomposes by oxidation, dehydration and decarbonation, to ferrihydrite, and ultimately to lepidocrocite or goethite, Fe^{III}O(OH).

== See also ==
- Clay minerals
- Gley soil
- Iron(II) hydroxide
