= Iron(II) hydroxide =

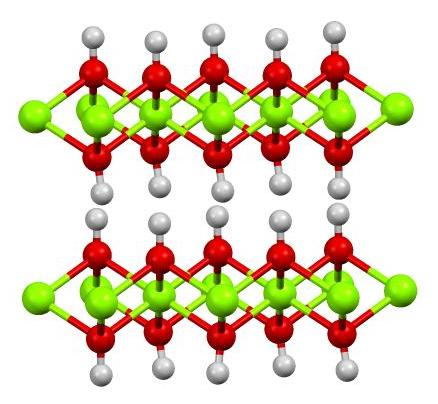

Names
- IUPAC name Iron(II) hydroxide
- Other names Ferrous hydroxide, green rust

Identifiers
CAS Number	18624-44-7
3D model (JSmol)	Interactive image
ChemSpider	8305416
ECHA InfoCard	100.038.581
PubChem CID	10129897
UNII	7JIM5W32UU
CompTox Dashboard (EPA)	DTXSID8066393
- InChI: InChI=1S/Fe.2H2O/h;2*1H2/q+2;;/p-2 Key: NCNCGGDMXMBVIA-UHFFFAOYSA-L; InChI=1/Fe.2H2O/h;2*1H2/q+2;;/p-2 Key: NCNCGGDMXMBVIA-NUQVWONBAV
- SMILES: O[Fe]O

Properties
Chemical formula	Fe(OH)_{2}
Molar mass	89.86 g/mol
Appearance	green solid
Density	3.4 g/cm^{3}
Solubility in water	0.000052 g/100 g water (20 °C, pH 7)
Solubility product (K_{sp})	8.0 × 10^{−16}
Acidity (pK_{a})	17

Hazards
Flash point	Non-flammable

Related compounds
Related compounds	Iron(II) oxide Iron(III) hydroxide
- Except where otherwise noted, data are given for materials in their standard state (at 25 °C [77 °F], 100 kPa). verify (what is ?) Infobox references

Iron (II) hydroxide or ferrous hydroxide is an inorganic compound with the formula Fe(OH)_{2}. It is produced when iron (II) salts, from a compound such as iron(II) sulfate, are treated with hydroxide ions. Iron(II) hydroxide is a white solid, but even traces of oxygen impart a greenish tinge. The air-oxidised solid is sometimes known as "green rust".

== Preparation and reactions ==
Iron(II) hydroxide is poorly soluble in water (1.43 × 10^{−3} g/L), or 1.59 × 10^{−5} mol/L. It precipitates from the reaction of iron(II) and hydroxide salts:

FeSO_{4} + 2 NaOH → Fe(OH)_{2} + Na_{2}SO_{4}

If the solution is not deoxygenated and iron not totally reduced in Fe(II), the precipitate can vary in colour starting from green to reddish brown depending on the iron(III) content. Iron(II) ions are easily substituted by iron(III) ions produced by its progressive oxidation.

It is also easily formed as a by-product of other reactions, a.o., in the synthesis of siderite, an iron carbonate (FeCO_{3}), if the crystal growth conditions are imperfectly controlled.

== Structure ==
Fe(OH)_{2} adopts the brucite structure, i.e. the arrangement of the atoms in the crystal are the same as the arrangement of the atoms in Mg(OH)_{2}. The Fe(II) centers are bonded to six hydroxide ligands. Each hydroxide ligand bridges to three Fe(II) sites. The O-H bonds are perpendicular to the planes defined by the oxygen atoms, projecting above and below these layers.

== Reactions ==
Under anaerobic conditions, the iron(II) hydroxide can be oxidised by the protons of water to form magnetite (iron(II,III) oxide) and molecular hydrogen. This process is described by the Schikorr reaction:

3 Fe(OH)_{2} → Fe_{3}O_{4} + H_{2} + 2 H_{2}O

Anions such as selenite and selenate can be easily adsorbed on the positively charged surface of iron(II) hydroxide, where they are subsequently reduced by Fe^{2+}. The resulting products are poorly soluble (Se^{0}, FeSe, or FeSe_{2}).

== Natural occurrence ==
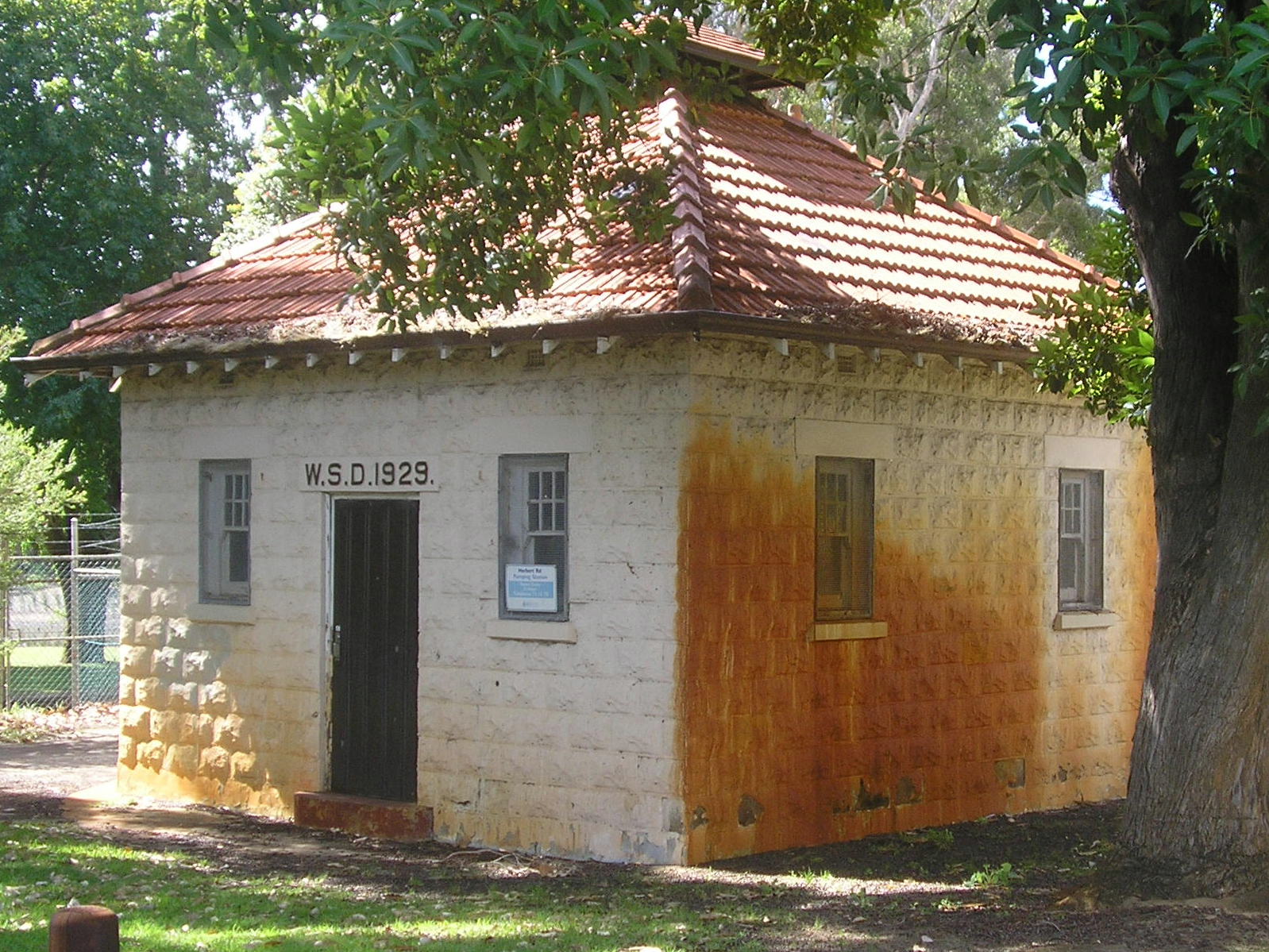
Iron III hydroxide staining caused by oxidation of dissolved iron II and precipitation, Perth, Western Australia.

Iron dissolved in groundwater is in the reduced iron II form. If this groundwater comes in contact with oxygen at the surface, e.g. in natural springs, iron II is oxidised to iron III and forms insoluble hydroxides in water. The natural analogue of iron(II) hydroxide compound is the very rare mineral amakinite, (Fe,Mg)(OH)_{2}.

== Application ==
Iron(II) hydroxide has also been investigated as an agent for the removal of toxic selenate and selenite ions from water systems such as wetlands. The iron(II) hydroxide reduces these ions to elemental selenium, which is insoluble in water and precipitates out.

In a basic solution iron(II) hydroxide is the electrochemically active material of the negative electrode of the nickel-iron battery.

== See also ==
- Layered double hydroxides
