= Mars Black (pigment) =

Iron dioxide pigment

Mars Black is an iron oxide pigment developed in the 20th century. Also known under the names of black iron oxide, magnetic oxide, Pigment Black 11, and ferrous ferric oxide (Fe_{3}O_{4}), it has no known health hazards and is considered non-toxic, with an ASTM lightfastness rating of I. It is more opaque and less toxic than other black pigments. Artists' paint manufacturers have rated it one of the most satisfactory black pigments for acrylic paints with regard to opacity, lightfastness, and permanence. It takes its name from Mars, the god of war and patron of iron.

== See also ==
- List of inorganic pigments
