= Green rust =

Generic name for various green iron layered double hydroxide

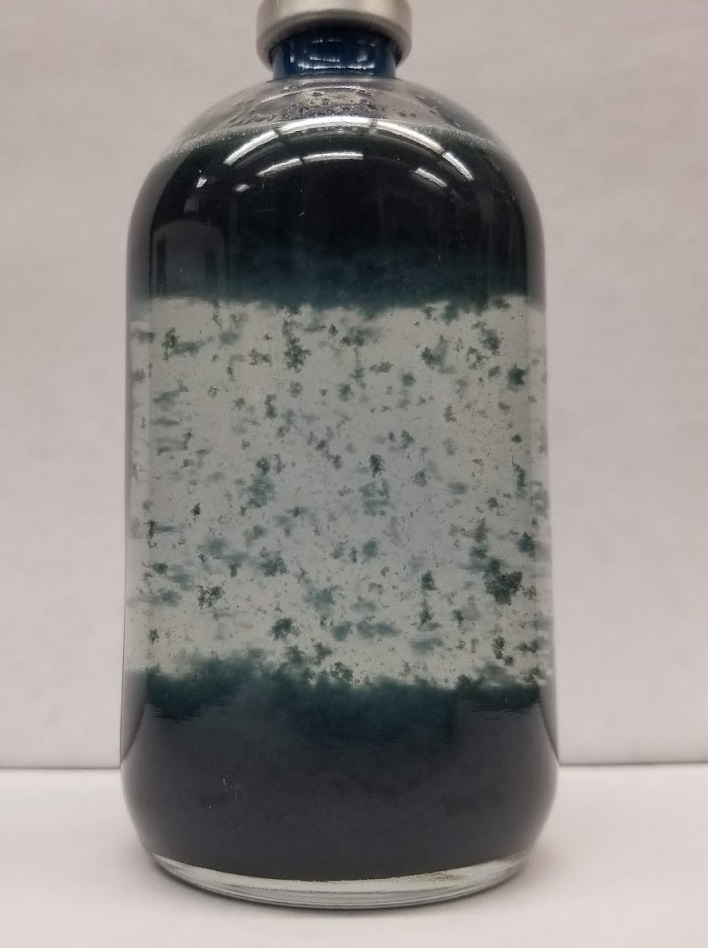
Green rust (SO^{2−}_{4}) synthesized under anaerobic conditions in the absence of dissolved oxygen.

Green rust is a generic name for various green crystalline chemical compounds containing iron(II) and iron(III) cations, the hydroxide (OH^{−}) anion, and another anion such as carbonate (CO^{2−}_{3}), chloride (Cl^{−}), or sulfate (SO^{2−}_{4}), in a layered double hydroxide (LDH) structure. The most studied varieties are the following:

- carbonate green rust – GR (CO^{2−}_{3}):
  [Fe^{2+}_{4}Fe^{3+}_{2}(OH^{−})_{12}]^{2+} · [CO^{2−}_{3}·2H_{2}O]^{2−};
- chloride green rust – GR (Cl^{−}):
  [Fe^{2+}_{3}Fe^{3+}(OH^{−})_{8}]^{+} · [Cl^{−}·nH_{2}O]^{−};
- sulfate green rust – GR (SO^{2−}_{4}):
  [Fe^{2+}_{4}Fe^{3+}_{2}(OH^{−})_{12}]^{2+} · [SO^{2−}_{4}·2H_{2}O]^{2−}.

Other varieties reported in the literature are bromide Br^{−}, fluoride F^{−}, iodide I^{−}, nitrate NO^{−}_{3}, and selenate SeO^{2−}_{4}.

Green rust was first recognized as a corrosion crust on iron and steel surfaces. It occurs in nature as the mineral fougerite.

== Structure ==
The crystal structure of green rust can be understood as the result of inserting the foreign anions and water molecules between brucite-like layers of iron(II) hydroxide, Fe(OH)_{2}. The latter has an hexagonal crystal structure, with layer sequence AcBAcB... , where A and B are planes of hydroxide ions, and c those of Fe^{2+} (iron(II), ferrous) cations. In green rust, some Fe^{2+} cations get oxidized to Fe^{3+} (iron(III), ferric). Each triple layer AcB, which is electrically neutral in the hydroxide, becomes positively charged. The anions then intercalate between those triple layers and restore the electroneutrality.

There are two basic structures of green rust, "type 1" and "type 2". Type 1 is exemplified by the chloride and carbonate varieties. It has a rhombohedral crystal structure similar to that of pyroaurite (Mg_{6}Fe_{2}(OH)_{16}CO_{3}·4H_{2}O). The layers are stacked in the sequence AcBiBaCjCbAkA ...; where A, B, and C represent OH^{−} planes, a, b, and c are layers of mixed Fe^{2+} and Fe^{3+} cations, and i, j, and k are layers of the intercalated anions and water molecules. The c crystallographic parameter is 22.5–22.8 Å for the carbonate, and about 24 Å for the chloride.

Type 2 green rust is exemplified by the sulfate variety. It has an hexagonal crystal structure as minerals of the sjogrenite (Mg_{6}Fe_{2}(OH)_{16}CO_{3}·4H_{2}O) group, with layers probably stacked in the sequence AcBiAbCjA...

== Chemical properties ==
In oxidizing environment, green rust generally turns into Fe^{3+} oxyhydroxides, namely α-FeOOH (goethite) and γ-FeOOH (lepidocrocite).

Oxidation of the carbonate variety can be retarded by wetting the material with hydroxyl-containing organic compounds such as glycerol or glucose, even though they do not penetrate the structure. Some variety of green rust is stabilized also by an atmosphere with high CO_{2} partial pressure.

Sulfate green rust has been shown to reduce nitrate NO^{−}_{3} and nitrite NO^{−}_{2} in solution to ammonium NH^{+}_{4}, with concurrent oxidation of Fe^{2+} to Fe^{3+}. Depending on the cations in the solution, the nitrate anions replaced the sulfate in the intercalation layer, before the reduction. It was conjectured that green rust may be formed in the reducing alkaline conditions below the surface of marine sediments and may be connected to the disappearance of oxidized species like nitrate in that environment.

Suspensions of carbonate green rust and orange γ-FeOOH in water react over a few days producing a black precipitate of magnetite Fe_{3}O_{4}.

== Occurrence ==
=== Iron and steel corrosion ===
Green rust compounds were identified in green corrosion crusts that form on iron and steel surfaces, in alternating aerobic and anaerobic conditions, by water containing anions such as chloride, sulfate, carbonate, or bicarbonate. They are considered to be intermediates in the oxidative corrosion of iron to form iron(III) oxyhydroxides (ordinary brown rust). Green rust may be formed either directly from metallic iron or from iron(II) hydroxide Fe(OH)_{2}.

=== Reducing conditions in soils ===
On the basis of Mössbauer spectroscopy, green rust is suspected to occur as mineral in certain bluish-green soils that are formed in alternating redox conditions, and turn ochre once exposed to air. Green rust has been conjectured to be present in the form of the mineral fougerite ([Fe^{2+}_{4}Fe^{3+}_{2}(OH)_{12}][CO_{3}]·3H_{2}O).

=== Biologically mediated formation ===
Hexagonal crystals of green rust (carbonate and/or sulfate) have also been obtained as byproducts of bioreduction of ferric oxyhydroxides by dissimilatory iron-reducing bacteria, such as Shewanella putrefaciens, that couple the reduction of Fe^{3+} with the oxidation of organic matter. This process has been conjectured to occur in soil solutions and aquifers.

In one experiment, a 160 mM suspension of orange lepidocrocite γ-FeOOH in a solution containing formate (HCO^{−}_{2}), incubated for 3 days with a culture of Shewanella putrefaciens, turned dark green due to the conversion of the hydroxide to GR(CO^{2−}_{3}), in the form of hexagonal platelets with diameter ~7 μm. In this process, the formate was oxidized to bicarbonate HCO^{−}_{3} which provided the carbonate anions for the formation of green rust. The active bacteria were necessary for the formation of green rust.

== Laboratory preparation ==
=== Air oxidation methods ===
Green rust compounds can be synthesized at ambient temperature and pressure, from solutions containing iron(II) cations, hydroxide anions, and the appropriate intercalatory anions, such as chloride, sulfate, or carbonate.

The result is a suspension of ferrous hydroxide (Fe(OH)_{2}) in a solution of the third anion. This suspension is oxidized by stirring under air, or bubbling air through it. Since the product is very prone to oxidation, it is necessary to monitor the process and exclude oxygen once the desired ratio of Fe^{2+} and Fe^{3+} is achieved.

One method first combines an iron(II) salt with sodium hydroxide (NaOH) to form the ferrous hydroxide suspension. Then the sodium salt of the third anion is added, and the suspension is oxidized by stirring under air.

For example, carbonate green rust can be prepared by mixing solutions of iron(II) sulfate FeSO_{4} and sodium hydroxide; then adding sufficient amount of sodium carbonate Na_{2}CO_{3} solution, followed by the air oxidation step.

Sulfate green rust can be obtained by mixing solutions of FeCl_{2}·4H_{2}O and NaOH to precipitate Fe(OH)_{2} then immediately adding sodium sulfate Na_{2}SO_{4} and proceeding to the air oxidation step.

A more direct method combines a solution of iron(II) sulfate FeSO_{4} with NaOH, and proceeding to the oxidizing step. The suspension must have a slight excess of FeSO_{4} (in the ratio of 0.5833 Fe^{2+} for each OH^{−}) for green rust to form; however, too much of it will produce instead an insoluble basic iron sulfate, iron(II) sulfate hydroxide Fe_{2}(SO_{4})(OH)_{2}·nH_{2}O. The production of green rust is lower as temperature increases.

=== Stoichiometric Fe(II)/Fe(III) methods ===
An alternate preparation of carbonate green rust first produces a suspension of iron(III) hydroxide Fe(OH)_{3} in an iron(II) chloride FeCl_{2} solution, and bubbles carbon dioxide through it.

In a more recent variant, solutions of both iron(II) and iron(III) salts are first mixed, then a solution of NaOH is added, all in the stoichiometric proportions of the desired green rust. No oxidation step is then necessary.

=== Electrochemistry ===
Carbonate green rust films have also been obtained from the electrochemical oxidation of iron plates.
