= Chukanovite =

Iron(II) hydroxy-carbonate mineral

General
- Category: Carbonate
- Formula: Fe_{2}(CO_{3})(OH)_{2}
- IMA symbol: Ckn
- Strunz classification: 05.BA.10
- Crystal system: Monoclinic
- Crystal class: Prismatic (2/m) (same H-M symbol)
- Space group: P2_{1}/a
- Unit cell: a = 12.396 Å, b = 9.407 Å c = 3.2152 Å; β = 97.78°; Z = 4

Identification
- Formula mass: 206.88 g
- Color: Colorless, pale green (unaltered); brown to brownish green (at surface)
- Crystal habit: Acicular to fibrous crystals
- Cleavage: {021} Perfect
- Fracture: Irregular/uneven
- Tenacity: Brittle
- Mohs scale hardness: 3.5-4
- Luster: Vitreous
- Streak: White (unaltered), yellow (at surface)
- Diaphaneity: Transparent
- Density: 3.60 g/cm^{3}
- Optical properties: Biaxial negative
- Refractive index: n_{α}= 1.673 n_{β}= 1.770 n_{γ}= 1.780
- Birefringence: δ=0.1070
- Pleochroism: Nonpleochroic

Chukanovite is an iron(II) hydroxide-carbonate mineral with the ideal chemical formula Fe^{+2}_{2}(CO_{3})(OH)_{2}. It is a member of the rosasite mineral group and crystalizes in the monoclinic crystal system. Upon initial crystallization, it is typically pale green to colorless, but it takes on a brownish green hue after being altered at the surface. As a weathering product of meteoritic iron, chukanovite is a relatively uncommon mineral on Earth, having only been discovered in the year 2000. However, it is commonly formed artificially as a corrosion byproduct through the manufacturing of sand-deposited carbon steel.

== Occurrence ==
Chukanovite was first discovered in weathered cavities of a meteorite which fell near the small village of Dronino, 350 km southeast of Moscow, Russia, but the mineral has since been found elsewhere in cavities of other iron-rich meteorites. It occurs primarily in association with goethite, akaganeite, hematite, hibbingite, reevesite, honessite, and kamacite, though the meteorites that contain chukanovite also tend to contain taenite and chromite. Individual crystals form from a reaction between kamacite and cold water that is rich in dissolved carbon dioxide, during which they adopt a fibrous to acicular habit and grow to an average size of roughly 0.5 mm in length and 2-3 μm in thickness. Individual crystals tend to coalesce within the meteorite cavities into porous collections or crusts of spherulites, each with a diameter of about 1 mm.

== Physical properties ==
Crystals of chukanovite are pale green to colorless with a vitreous luster. If exposed to air for extended periods of time, chukanovite will weather over the course of a few months, becoming brownish green and then increasingly losing its color and luster as time passes. Throughout the weathering process, the mineral's streak will also change color, from white when unaltered to brownish yellow when weathered. Regardless of the degree to which it is weathered, chukanovite's cleavage remains perfect on {021}, and its tenacity is always brittle. On the Mohs scale of mineral hardness, chukanovite lies between 3.5 and 4.0, making it softer than fluorite but harder than calcite. Its density is 3.60 g/cm^{3}.

== Optical and Chemical properties ==
Chukanovite is optically biaxial negative with α = 1.673, β = 1.770, γ = 1.780, 2V(meas.) = 10°, and 2V(calc.) = 34°. The crystals are transparent and nonpleochroic, and exhibit a birefringence of δ=0.1070.

The ideal chemical formula for chukanovite is Fe^{+2}_{2}(CO_{3})(OH)_{2} but actual composition can vary and usually includes nickel and magnesium. The empirical formula, calculated on the basis of two metal cations, is (Fe^{+2}_{1.97}Ni_{0.02}Mg_{0.01})_{Σ2.00}(CO_{3})_{0.93}(OH)_{2.14}•0.18H_{2}O. As a carbonate mineral, chukanovite effervesces readily in cold, dilute HCl solution.

== Chemical composition ==
The table below lists the average composition of oxides in chukanovite.

Oxide	wt%	Range
MgO	0.1	0.05-0.2
FeO	68.8	67.5-69.9
NiO	0.6	0.5-0.8
CO_{2}	19.8	-
H_{2}O	10.9	-
Total	100.2	-

== X-ray crystallography ==
Chukanovite crystallizes in the monoclinic crystal system, within the 2/m point group and P2_{1}/a space group. Its unit cell consists of three unequal axes lengths with angles α = γ = 90°; β = 97.78°. The unit cell dimensions were measured via x-ray powder diffraction and are a = 12.396 Å, b = 9.407 Å, c = 3.2152 Å, and Z = 4. The following chart tabulates the x-ray diffractogram results for chukanovite using conventional x-ray diffraction methods with FeKα radiation (λ = 1.93 Å).

d_{obs} (Å)	I_{obs}	hkl
7.53	15	110
6.13	40	200
5.15	60	210
4.73	15	020
3.73	80	310
3.21	5	001
3.05	30	320
2.916	25	410
2.798	95	230
2.645	100	021
2.56	35	420
2.361	40	510
2.236	10	-131
2.171	40	520
2.137	30	-421
2.04	20	231
1.966	15	530
1.901	<5	-521
1.875	10	620
1.85	5	-241
1.797	20	250
1.766	10	241
1.733	50	-531

== See also ==
- List of minerals
- Malachite
