= Serpentinization =

Formation of serpentinite by hydration and metamorphic transformation of olivine

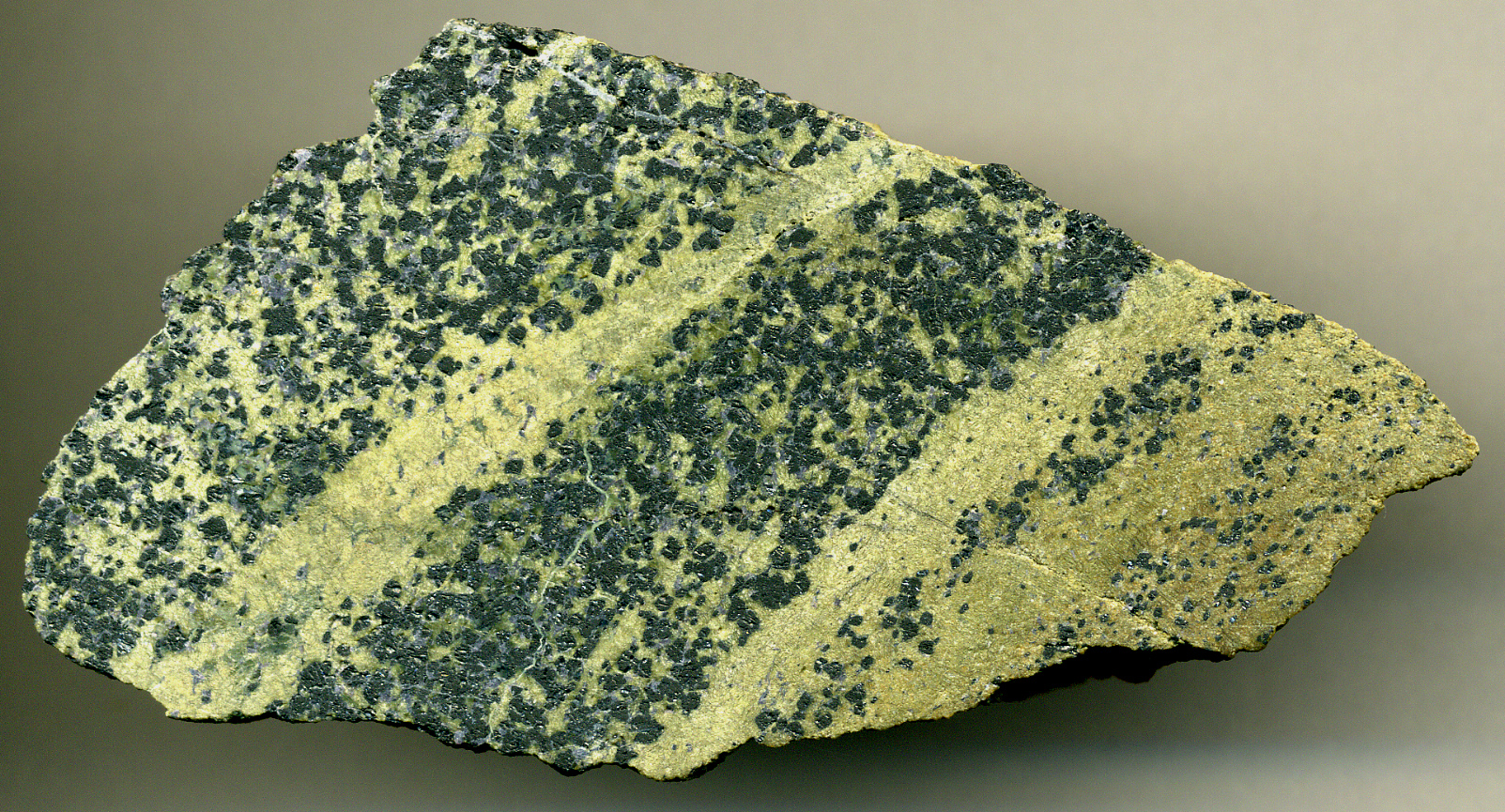
Chromitic serpentinite from Styria Province, Austria

Serpentinization is a hydration and metamorphic transformation of ferromagnesian minerals, such as olivine and pyroxene, in mafic and ultramafic rock to produce serpentinite. Minerals formed by serpentinization include the serpentine group minerals (antigorite, lizardite, chrysotile), brucite, talc, Ni-Fe alloys, and magnetite. The mineral alteration is particularly important at the sea floor at tectonic plate boundaries.

== Formation and petrology ==
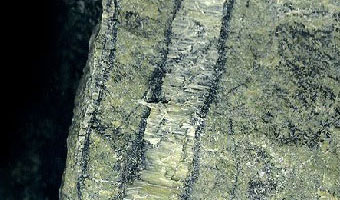
Serpentinite partially made of chrysotile, from Dobšiná, Slovakia

Serpentinization is a form of low-temperature (0 to ~600 °C) metamorphism of ferromagnesian minerals in mafic and ultramafic rocks, such as dunite, harzburgite, or lherzolite. These are rocks low in silica and composed mostly of olivine ((Mg^{2+}, Fe^{2+})_{2}SiO_{4}), pyroxene (XY(Si,Al)_{2}O_{6}), and chromite (approximately FeCr_{2}O_{4}). Serpentinization is driven largely by hydration and oxidation of olivine and pyroxene to serpentine group minerals (antigorite, lizardite, and chrysotile), brucite (Mg(OH)_{2}), talc (Mg_{3}Si_{4}O_{10}(OH)_{2}), and magnetite (Fe_{3}O_{4}). Under the unusual chemical conditions accompanying serpentinization, water is the oxidizing agent, and is itself reduced to hydrogen, H_{2}. This leads to further reactions that produce rare iron group native element minerals, such as awaruite (Ni_{3}Fe) and native iron; methane and other hydrocarbon compounds; and hydrogen sulfide.

During serpentinization, large amounts of water are absorbed into the rock, increasing the volume, reducing the density and destroying the original structure. The density changes from 3.3 to 2.5 g/cm^{3} (0.119 to 0.090 lb/cu in) with a concurrent volume increase on the order of 30-40%. The reaction is highly exothermic, releasing up to 40 kilojoules (9.6 kcal) per mole of water reacting with the rock, and rock temperatures can be raised by about 260 °C (500 °F), providing an energy source for formation of non-volcanic hydrothermal vents. The hydrogen, methane, and hydrogen sulfide produced during serpentinization are released at these vents and provide energy sources for deep sea chemotroph microorganisms.

=== Formation of serpentine minerals ===
Olivine is a solid solution of forsterite, the magnesium endmember of (Mg^{2+}, Fe^{2+})_{2}SiO_{4}, and fayalite, the iron endmember, with forsterite typically making up about 90% of the olivine in ultramafic rocks. Serpentine can form from olivine via several reactions:

| + SiO_{2} + 4 H_{2}O → | Reaction 1a |

| + 3 H_{2}O → + | Reaction 1b |

Reaction 1a tightly binds silica, lowering its chemical activity to the lowest values seen in common rocks of the Earth's crust. Serpentinization then continues through the hydration of olivine to yield serpentine and brucite (Reaction 1b). The mixture of brucite and serpentine formed by Reaction 1b has the lowest silica activity in the serpentinite, so that the brucite phase is very important in understanding serpentinization. However, the brucite is often blended in with the serpentine such that it is difficult to identify except with X-ray diffraction, and it is easily altered under surface weathering conditions.

A similar suite of reactions involves pyroxene-group minerals:

| + SiO_{2} + H_{2}O → | Reaction 2a |

| + 3 H_{2}O → + | Reaction 2b |

Reaction 2a quickly comes to a halt as silica becomes unavailable, and Reaction 2b takes over. When olivine is abundant, silica activity drops low enough that talc begins to react with olivine:

| + + 9 H_{2}O → | Reaction 3 |

This reaction requires higher temperatures than those at which brucite forms.

The final mineralogy depends both on rock and fluid compositions, temperature, and pressure. Antigorite forms in reactions at temperatures that can exceed 600 °C (1,112 °F) during metamorphism, and it is the serpentine group mineral stable at the highest temperatures. Lizardite and chrysotile can form at low temperatures very near the Earth's surface.

=== Breakdown of diopside and formation of rodingites ===
Ultramafic rocks often contain calcium-rich pyroxene (diopside), which breaks down according to the reaction:

| + 6 H^{+} → + 3 Ca^{2+} + H_{2}O + 4 SiO_{2} | Reaction 4 |

This raises both the pH, often to very high values, and the calcium content of the fluids involved in serpentinization. These fluids are highly reactive and may transport calcium and other elements into surrounding mafic rocks. Fluid reaction with these rocks may create metasomatic reaction zones enriched in calcium and depleted in silica, called rodingites.

=== Formation of magnetite and hydrogen ===
In most crustal rock, the chemical activity of oxygen is prevented from dropping to very low values by the fayalite-magnetite-quartz (FMQ) buffer. The very low chemical activity of silica during serpentinization eliminates this buffer, creating highly reducing conditions that allow water to oxidize ferrous (Fe^{2+}) ions in fayalite. This reaction modifies minerals and liberates hydrogen gas:

| + 2 H_{2}O → + 3 SiO_{2} + 2 H_{2} | Reaction 5 |

Studies of serpentinites suggest that in nature iron minerals are first converted to ferroan brucite, that is, brucite containing Fe(OH)_{2}, which then undergoes the Schikorr reaction in the anaerobic conditions of serpentinization:

| → + 4 H_{2}O + 2 H_{2} | Reaction 6 |

Maximum reducing conditions, and the maximum rate of production of hydrogen, occur when the temperature of serpentinization is between 200 and 315 °C (392 and 599 °F) and when fluids are carbonate undersaturated. If the original ultramafic rock (the protolith) is peridotite, which is rich in olivine, considerable magnetite and hydrogen are produced. When the protolith is pyroxenite, which contains more pyroxene than olivine, iron-rich talc is produced with no magnetite and only modest hydrogen production. Infiltration of silica-bearing fluids during serpentinization can suppress both the formation of brucite and the subsequent production of hydrogen.

Chromite present in the protolith will be altered to chromium-rich magnetite at lower serpentinization temperatures. At higher temperatures, it will be altered to iron-rich chromite (ferrit-chromite). During serpentinization, the rock is enriched in chlorine, boron, fluorine, and sulfur. Sulfur will be reduced to hydrogen sulfide and sulfide minerals, though significant quantities are incorporated into serpentine minerals, and some may later be reoxidized to sulfate minerals such as anhydrite. The sulfides produced include nickel-rich sulfides, such as mackinawite.

=== Methane and other hydrocarbons ===
Laboratory experiments have confirmed that at a temperature of 300 °C (572 °F) and pressure of 500 bars, olivine serpentinizes with release of hydrogen gas. Abiotic methane formation related to serpentinization has been shown in much lower temperatures and pressure systems, associated with ultramafic rocks in ophiolites, and in continental systems such as the greenstone belts of the Canadian Shield. In addition, methane and complex hydrocarbons are formed through reduction of carbon dioxide. The process may be catalyzed by magnetite formed during serpentinization. One reaction pathway is:

| + + 26 H_{2}O + CO_{2} → + + | Reaction 7 |

=== Metamorphism at higher pressure and temperature ===
Lizardite and chrysotile are stable at low temperatures and pressures, while antigorite is stable at higher temperatures and pressure. Its presence in a serpentinite indicates either that serpentinization took place at unusually high pressure and temperature or that the rock experienced higher grade metamorphism after serpentinization was complete.

Infiltration of CO_{2}-bearing fluids into serpentinite causes distinctive talc-carbonate alteration. Brucite rapidly converts to magnesite and serpentine minerals (other than antigorite) are converted to talc. The presence of pseudomorphs of the original serpentinite minerals shows that this alteration takes place after serpentinization.

Serpentinite may contain chlorite (a phyllosilicate mineral), tremolite (Ca_{2}(Mg_{5.0-4.5}Fe^{2+}_{0.0-0.5})Si_{8}O_{22}(OH)_{2}), and metamorphic olivine and diopside (calcium-rich pyroxene). This indicates that the serpentinite has been subject to more intense metamorphism, reaching the upper greenschist or amphibolite metamorphic facies.

Above about 450 °C (842 °F), antigorite begins to break down. Thus serpentinite does not exist at higher metamorphic facies.

=== Extraterrestrial production of methane by serpentinization ===
The presence of traces of methane in the atmosphere of Mars has been hypothesized to be a possible evidence for life on Mars if methane was produced by bacterial activity. Serpentinization has been proposed as an alternative non-biological source for the observed methane traces. In 2022, it was reported that microscopic examination of the ALH 84001 meteorite, which came from Mars, shows that indeed the organic matter it contains was formed by serpentinization, not by life processes.

Using data from the Cassini probe flybys obtained in 2010–12, scientists were able to confirm that Saturn's moon Enceladus likely has a liquid water ocean beneath its frozen surface. A model suggests that the ocean on Enceladus has an alkaline pH of 11–12. The high pH is interpreted to be a key consequence of serpentinization of chondritic rock, that leads to the generation of H_{2}, a geochemical source of energy that can support both abiotic and biological synthesis of organic molecules.

== Environment of formation ==
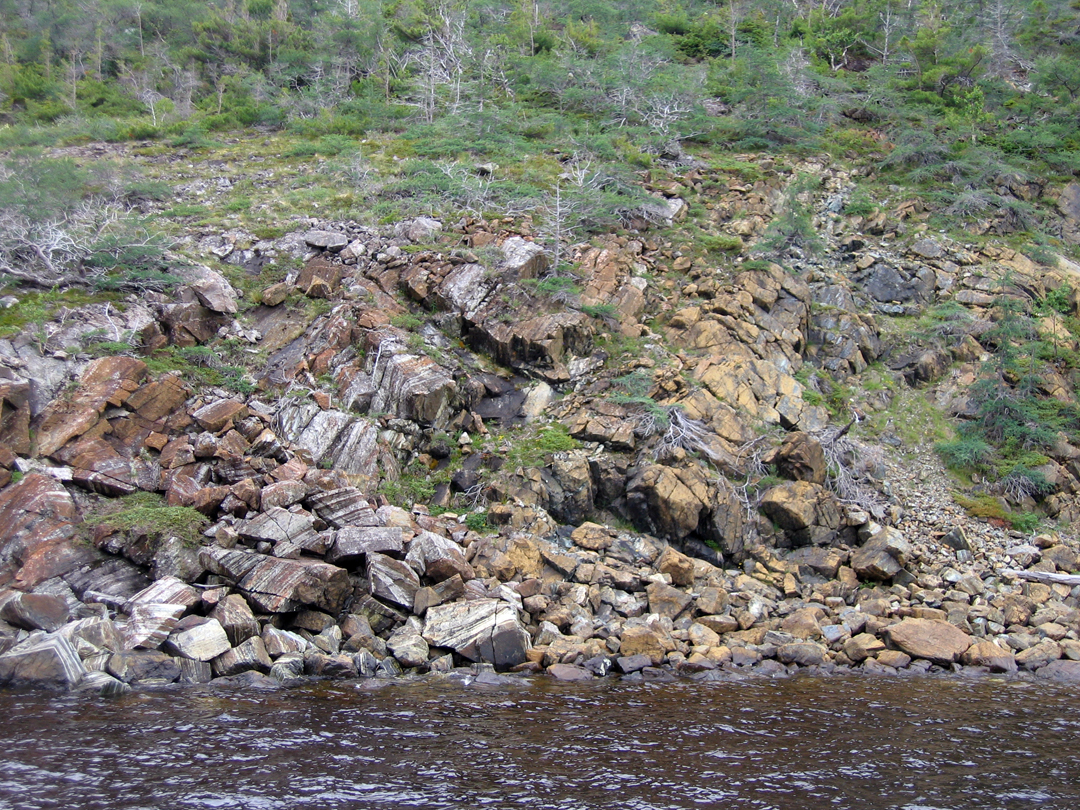
Ophiolite of the Gros Morne National Park, Newfoundland (Labrador, Canada). Ophiolites characteristically have a serpentinite component.

Serpentinization occurs at mid-ocean ridges, in the forearc mantle of subduction zones, in ophiolite packages, and in ultramafic intrusions.

=== Mid-ocean ridges ===
Conditions are highly favorable for serpentinization at slow to ultraslow spreading mid-ocean ridges. Here, the rate of crustal extension is high compared with the volume of magmatism, bringing ultramafic mantle rock very close to the surface where fracturing allows seawater to infiltrate the rock.

Serpentinization at slow-spreading mid-ocean ridges can cause the seismic Moho discontinuity to be placed at the serpentinization front, rather than the base of the crust as defined by normal petrological criteria. The Lanzo Massif of the Italian Alps shows a sharp serpentinization front that may be a relict of the seismic Moho discontinuity.

=== Subduction Zones ===
==== Forearc mantle ====
Serpentinization is an important phenomenon in subduction zones that has a strong control on the water cycle and geodynamics of a subduction zone. Here mantle rock is cooled by the subducting slab to temperatures at which serpentinite is stable, and fluids are released from the subducting slab in great quantities into the ultramafic mantle rock. Direct evidence that serpentinization is taking place in the Mariana Islands island arc is provided by the activity of serpentinite mud volcanoes. Xenoliths of harzburgite and (less commonly) dunite are occasionally erupted by the mud volcanoes, giving clues to the nature of the protolith.

Because serpentinization lowers the density of the original rock, serpentinization may lead to uplift or exhumation of serpentinites to the surface, as has taken place with the serpentinite exposed at the Presidio of San Francisco following cessation of subduction.

Serpentinized ultramafic rock is found in many ophiolites. Ophiolites are fragments of oceanic lithosphere that has been thrust onto continents, a process called obduction. They typically consist of a layer of serpentinized harzburgite (sometimes called alpine peridotite in older writings), a layer of hydrothermally altered diabases and pillow basalts, and a layer of deep water sediments containing radiolarian ribbon chert.

==== Continental Crust ====
In addition to ophiolites, ultramafic rocks in the continental crust are a key location for abiotic methane formation related to serpentinization, including kimberlites, and the vast Archean greenstone belts. The production of methane and other electron donors and electron acceptors such as natural hydrogen, are key to sustaining chemolithotrophic microbial communities in the deep biosphere.

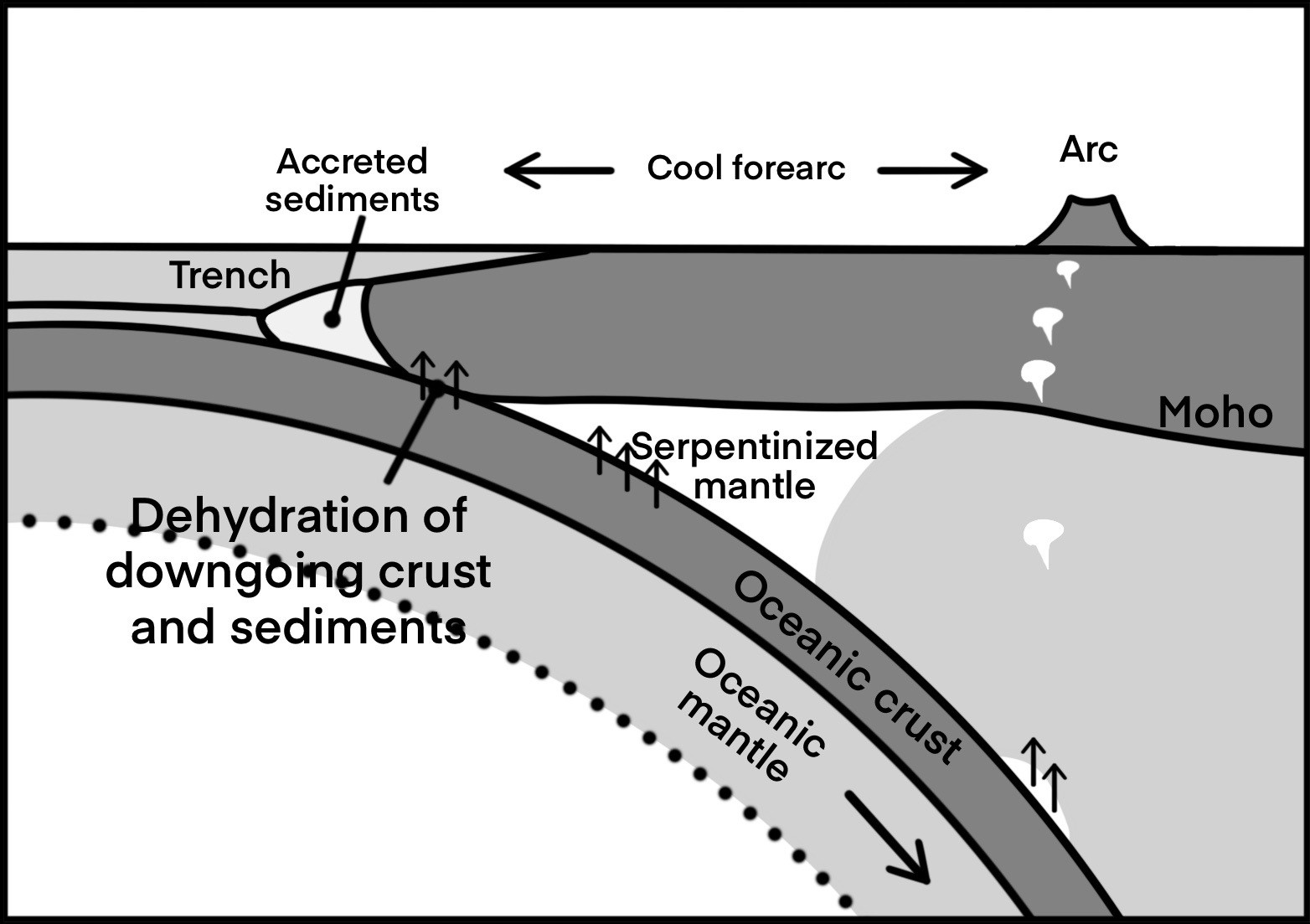
Hydration of forearc mantle due to the water expelled from deeper part of the subducting plate. Adapted from Hyndman and Peacock (2003)

=== Implications ===
==== Limitation on earthquake depth ====
Seismic wave studies can detect the presence of large bodies of serpentinite in the crust and upper mantle, since serpentinization has a huge impact on shear wave velocity. A higher degree of serpentinization will lead to lower shear wave velocity and higher Poisson's ratio. Seismic measurements confirm that serpentinization is pervasive in forearc mantle. The serpentinization can produce an inverted Moho discontinuity, in which seismic velocity abruptly decreases across the crust-mantle boundary, which is the opposite of the usual behavior. The serpentinite is highly deformable, creating an aseismic zone in the forearc, at which serpentinites slide at stable plate velocity. The presence of serpentinite may limit the maximum depth of megathrust earthquakes as they impede rupture into the forearc mantle.

== See also ==
- Schikorr reaction
- Serpentine subgroup
- Serpentinite
- Soapstone
- Hydrogen cycle
- Forearc
