= Dronino meteorite =

Iron meteorite found in Russia

- Fragment of Dronino meteorite
- Type: Iron meteorite
- Structural classification: Ataxite
- Country: Russia
- Region: Ryazan Oblast
- Coordinates: 54.746667°N 41.42166°E
- Observed fall: No
- Found date: 2002–2007
- TKW: 3,000 kilograms (6,600 lb)
- Related media on Wikimedia Commons

The Dronino meteorite is a 40-kilogram (88 lb) iron meteorite that was found in the Ryazan Oblast of Russia in July 2000. It is classified as an ataxite.

== Mineralogy ==
The Dronino meteorite is a classified as an ataxite (iron meteorite). Most of the meteoric iron is kamacite with minor amounts of taenite. The kamacite chemistry contains 7.0% Ni and 0.75% Co, whereas the taenite has 26.5% Ni and 0.35% Co (% of total mass). About 10% of the volume of the meteorite are sulfides. Accessory minerals include chromite and an iron-phosphate, which could possibly be graftonite.

== Impact ==
Because there are no historical descriptions of the impact event of the Meteorite it has been estimated that the fall would have to have occurred before the earliest settlements formed in that region in 1200.

From the distribution of the meteorite fragments it has been estimated that the meteorite formed a crater with a diameter of 30 m.

== Naming and discovery ==
The meteorite is named after the village Dronino where it was found. The meteorite was discovered by Oleg Gus’kov in July 2000 on his way home from mushroom collecting near the village of Dronino (54.746667°N 41.42166°E). He noticed a rusty piece of iron protruding from the ground. Suspecting it to be a meteorite but unable to exhume it, he returned the next day with a shovel and wheelbarrow. He brought the meteorite to his house, where it lay in his garden for the next two years. In this time the meteorite broke into three pieces. Gus’kov sawed one of the pieces apart upon which he realized that it was definitely a meteorite. After that he alerted different experts of his discovery. In early 2003, a piece was identified as a meteorite in Vernad (Vernad on Russian Wikipedia). Suspecting that Gus’kov had only found a fragment of a larger meteorite different search parties went to Dronino in summer 2003 and discovered more than 600 fragments with a total mass of about 3,000 kilograms (6,600 lb), the largest being 250 kilograms (550 lb).

== See also ==
- Glossary of meteoritics
