= Layered double hydroxides =

Class of ionic solids characterized by a layered structure

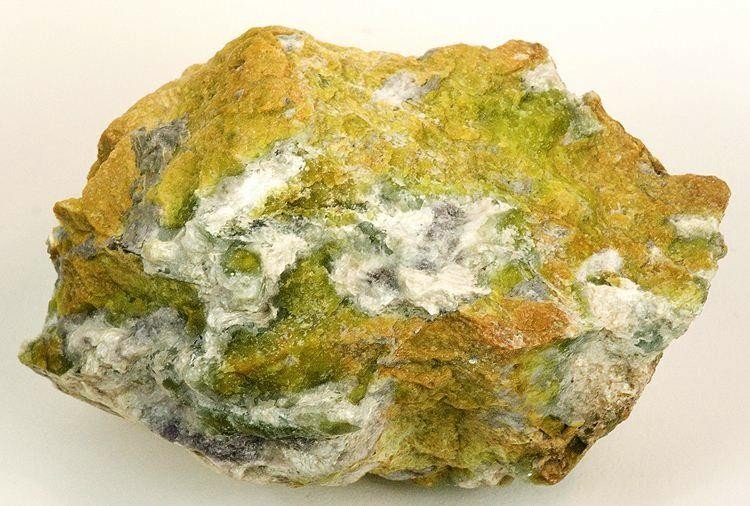
Hydrotalcite (white) and yellow-green serpentine, Snarum, Modum, Buskerud, Norway. Size: 8.4 × 5.2 × 4.1 cm.

Layered double hydroxides (LDH) are a class of ionic solids characterized by a layered structure with the generic layer sequence [AcB Z AcB]_{n}, where c represents layers of metal cations, A and B are layers of hydroxide (OH^{−}) anions, and Z are layers of other anions and neutral molecules (such as water). Lateral offsets between the layers may result in longer repeating periods.

The intercalated anions (Z) are weakly bound, often exchangeable; their intercalation properties have scientific interest and industrial applications.

LDHs occur in nature as minerals, as byproducts of metabolism of certain bacteria, and also unintentionally in man-made contexts, such as the products of corrosion of metal objects.

== Structure and formulas ==
LDHs can be seen as derived from hydroxides of divalent cations (d) with the brucite (Mg(OH)_{2}) layer structure [AdB AdB]_{n}, by cation (c) replacement (Mg^{2+} → Al^{3+}), or by cation oxidation (Fe^{2+} → Fe^{3+} in the case of green rust, Fe(OH)_{2}), in the metallic divalent (d) cation layers, so as to give them an excess positive electric charge; and intercalation of extra anion layers (Z) between the hydroxide layers (A,B) to neutralize that charge, resulting in the structure [AcB Z AcB]_{n}. LDHs can be formed with a wide variety of anions in the intercalated layers (Z), such as Cl^{−}, Br^{−}, NO^{−}_{3}, CO^{2−}_{3}, SO^{2−}_{4} and SeO^{2−}_{4}.

This structure is unusual in solid-state chemistry, since many materials with similar structure (such as montmorillonite and other clay minerals) have negatively charged main metal layers (c) and positive ions in the intercalated layers (Z).

In the most studied class of LDHs, the positive layer (c) consists of divalent and trivalent cations, and can be represented by the generic formula:

[M(II)_{1-x}M(III)_{x}(OH)_{2}]^{x+} [(X^{n−})_{x/n} · yH_{2}O]^{x–},

where X^{n−} is the intercalating anion compensating the excess of positive charge (x+) present in the metal hydroxide layer.

Most commonly, M(II) = Ca^{2+}, Mg^{2+}, Mn^{2+}, Fe^{2+}, Co^{2+}, Ni^{2+}, Cu^{2+} or Zn^{2+}, and M(III) is another trivalent cation (Al^{3+}, Cr^{3+}), or possibly of the same element as in the case of green rust with Fe^{3+}. Fixed-composition phases have been shown to exist over the range 0.2 ≤ x ≤ 0.33. However, phases with variable x hare also known, and in some cases, x > 0.5.

Another class of Li/Al LDH is known where the main metal layer (c) consists of Li^{+} and Al^{3+} cations in a molar ratio Li:Al = 1:2, so that the metal hydroxide layer only bears one unit of positive charge in excess, with the generic formula:

[LiAl_{2}(OH)_{6}]^{+} [(X^{n−})_{1/n} · yH_{2}O]^{−}.

In some cases, the pH value of the solution used during the synthesis and the high drying temperature of the LDH can eliminate the presence of the OH^{−} groups in the LDH. For example, in the synthesis of the (BiO)_{4}(OH)_{2}CO_{3} compound, a low pH value of the aqueous solution or higher annealing temperature of the solid can induce the formation of (BiO)_{2}CO_{3}, which is thermodynamically more stable than the LDH compound, by exchanging OH^{−} groups by CO_{3}^{2–} groups.

== Applications ==
The anions located in the interlayer regions can be replaced easily, in general. A wide variety of anions may be incorporated, ranging from simple inorganic anions (e.g. CO^{2−}_{3}) through organic anions (e.g. benzoate, succinate) to complex biomolecules, including DNA. This has led to an intense interest in the use of LDH intercalates for advanced applications. Drug molecules such as ibuprofen may be intercalated; the resulting nanocomposites have potential for use in controlled release systems, which could reduce the frequency of doses of medication needed to treat a disorder. Further effort has been expended on the intercalation of agrochemicals, such as the chlorophenoxyacetates, and important organic synthons, such as terephthalate and nitrophenols. Agrochemical intercalates are of interest because of the potential to use LDHs to remove agrochemicals from polluted water, reducing the likelihood of eutrophication.

LDHs exhibit shape-selective intercalation properties. For instance, treating LiAl_{2}-Cl with a 50:50 mixture of terephthalate (1,4-benzenedicarboxylate) and phthalate (1,2-benzenedicarboxylate) results in intercalation of the 1,4-isomer with almost 100% preference. The selective intercalation of ions such as benzenedicarboxylates and nitrophenols has importance because these are produced in isomeric mixtures from crude oil residues, and it is often desirable to isolate a single form, for instance in the production of polymers.

LDH-TiO_{2} intercalates are used in suspensions for self-cleaning of surfaces (especially for materials in cultural heritage), because of photo-catalytic properties of TiO_{2} and good compatibility of LDHs with inorganic materials.

== Minerals ==
Naturally occurring (i.e., mineralogical) examples of LDH are classified as members of the hydrotalcite supergroup, named after the Mg-Al carbonate hydrotalcite, which is the longest-known example of a natural LDH phase. More than 40 mineral species are known to fall within this supergroup. The dominant divalent cations, M^{2+}, that have been reported in hydrotalcite supergroup minerals are: Mg, Ca, Mn, Fe, Ni, Cu and Zn; the dominant trivalent cations, M^{3+}, are: Al, Mn, Fe, Co and Ni. The most common intercalated anions are [CO_{3}]^{2−}, [SO_{4}]^{2−} and Cl^{−}; OH^{−}, S^{2−} and [Sb(OH)_{6}]^{−} have also been reported. Some species contain intercalated cationic or neutral complexes such as [Na(H_{2}O)_{6}]^{+} or [MgSO_{4}]^{0}. The International Mineralogical Association's 2012 report on hydrotalcite supergroup nomenclature defines eight groups within the supergroup on the basis of a combination of criteria. These groups are:

1. the hydrotalcite group, with M^{2+}:M^{3+} = 3:1 (layer spacing ~7.8 Å);
2. the quintinite group, with M^{2+}:M^{3+} = 2:1 (layer spacing ~7.8 Å);
3. the fougèrite group of natural 'green rust' phases, with M^{2+} = Fe^{2+}, M^{3+} = Fe^{3+} in a range of ratios, and with O^{2−} replacing OH^{−} in the brucite module to maintain charge balance (layer spacing ~7.8 Å);
4. the woodwardite group, with variable M^{2+}:M^{3+} and interlayer [SO_{4}]^{2−}, leading to an expanded layer spacing of ~8.9 Å;
5. the cualstibite group, with interlayer [Sb(OH)_{6}]^{−} and a layer spacing of ~9.7 Å;
6. the glaucocerinite group, with interlayer [SO_{4}]^{2−} as in the woodwardite group, and with additional interlayer H_{2}O molecules that further expand the layer spacing to ~11 Å;
7. the wermlandite group, with a layer spacing of ~11 Å, in which cationic complexes occur with anions between the brucite-like layers; and
8. the hydrocalumite group, with M^{2+} = Ca^{2+} and M^{3+} = Al^{3+}, which contains brucite-like layers in which the Ca:Al ratio is 2:1 and the large cation, Ca^{2+}, is coordinated to a seventh ligand of 'interlayer' water.

The IMA Report also presents a concise systematic nomenclature for synthetic LDH phases that are not eligible for a mineral name. This uses the prefix LDH, and characterises components by the numbers of the octahedral cation species in the chemical formula, the interlayer anion, and the Ramsdell polytype symbol (number of layers in the repeat of the structure, and crystal system). For example, the 3R polytype of Mg_{6}Al_{2}(OH)_{12}(CO_{3}).4H_{2}O (hydrotalcite sensu stricto) is described by "LDH 6Mg2Al·CO3-3R". This simplified nomenclature does not capture all the possible types of structural complexity in LDH materials. Elsewhere, the Report discusses examples of:

1. long-range order of different cations within a brucite-like layer, which may produce sharp superstructure peaks in diffraction patterns and a and b periodicities that are multiples of the basic 3 Å repeat, or short-range order producing diffuse scattering;
2. the wide variety of c periodicities that can occur due to relative displacements or rotations of the brucite-like layers, producing multiple polytypes with the same compositions, intergrowths of polytypes and variable degrees of stacking disorder;
3. different periodicities arising from order of different interlayer species, either within an interlayer or by alternation of different anion types from interlayer to interlayer.

== See also ==
- Maalox, magnesium-aluminium oxide used as antacid
