= Iron(II) oxide =

Inorganic compound with the formula FeO

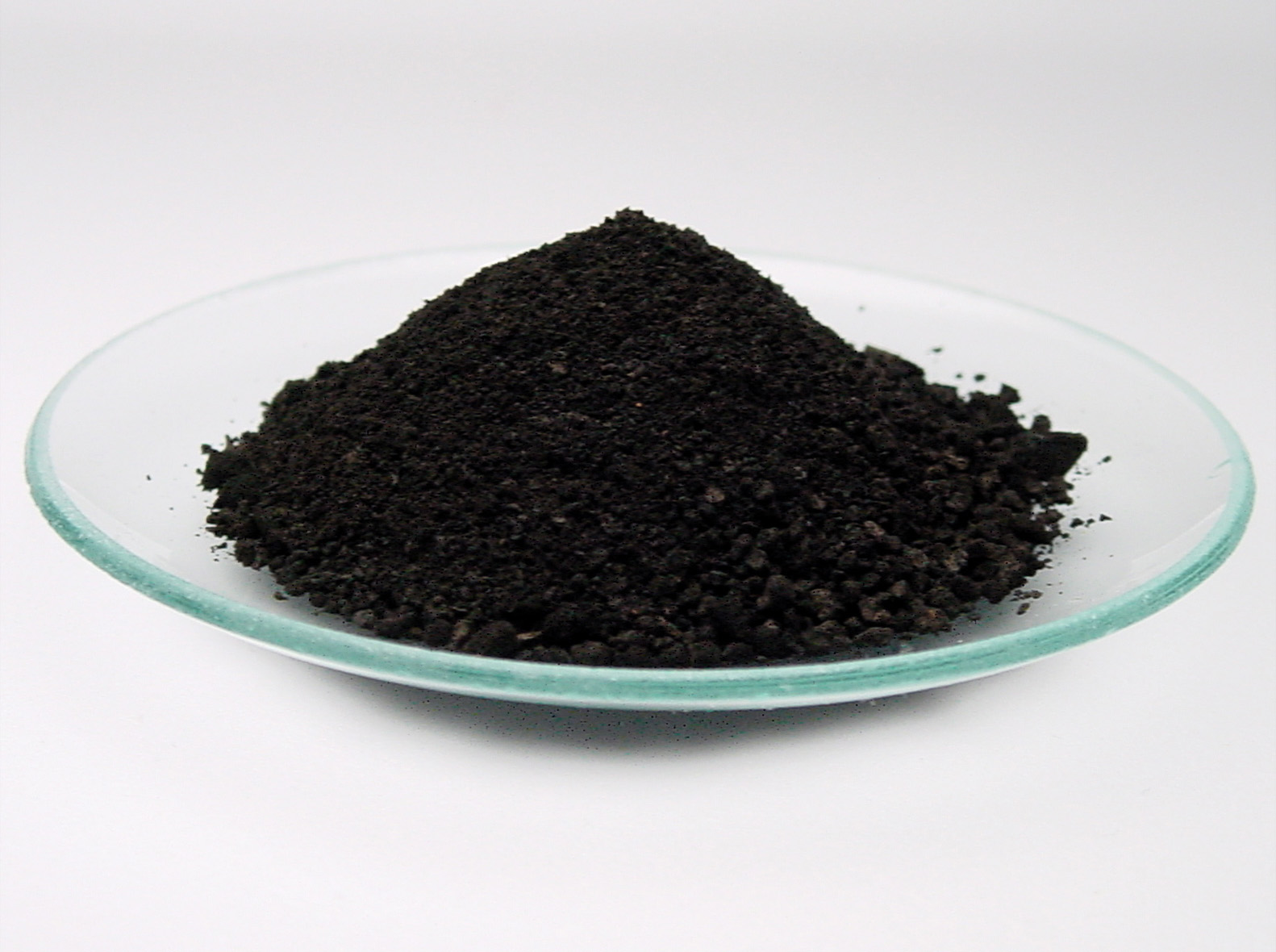
- Iron(II) oxide

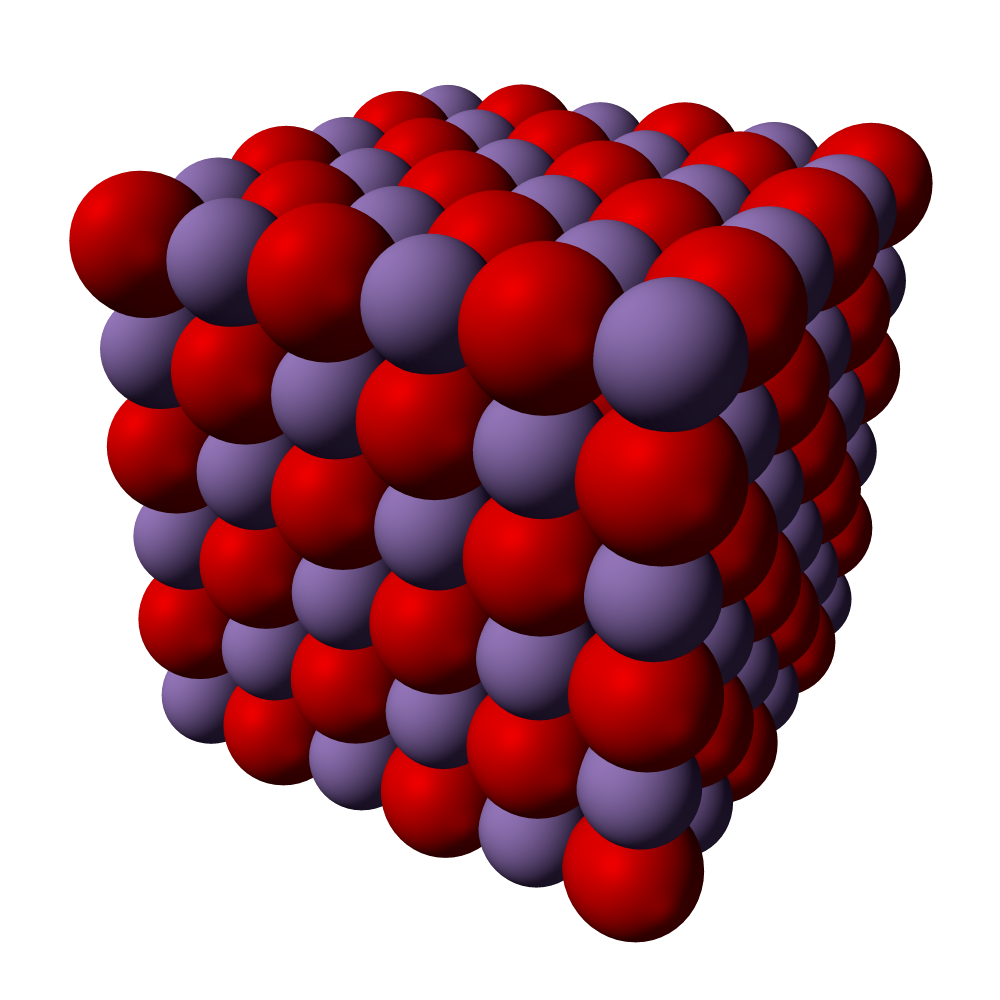

Names
- IUPAC name Iron(II) oxide
- Other names Ferrous oxide, Iron monoxide, Wüstite

Identifiers
CAS Number	1345-25-1
3D model (JSmol)	Interactive image
ChEBI	CHEBI:50820
ChemSpider	14237
ECHA InfoCard	100.014.292
Gmelin Reference	13590
PubChem CID	14945
UNII	G7036X8B5H
CompTox Dashboard (EPA)	DTXSID1041976
- InChI: InChI=1S/Fe.O Key: UQSXHKLRYXJYBZ-UHFFFAOYSA-N; InChI=1/Fe.O/rFeO/c1-2 Key: UQSXHKLRYXJYBZ-WPTVXXAFAB
- SMILES: [Fe]=O

Properties
Chemical formula	FeO
Molar mass	71.844 g/mol
Appearance	black crystals
Density	5.745 g/cm^{3}
Melting point	1,377 °C (2,511 °F; 1,650 K)
Boiling point	3,414 °C (6,177 °F; 3,687 K)
Solubility in water	Insoluble
Solubility	insoluble in alkali, alcohol dissolves in acid
Magnetic susceptibility (χ)	+7200×10^{−6} cm^{3}/mol
Refractive index (n_{D})	2.23

Hazards
- Occupational safety and health (OHS/OSH)
Main hazards	can be combustible under specific conditions
NFPA 704 (fire diamond)	1 1 0
Autoignition temperature	200 °C (392 °F; 473 K)
Safety data sheet (SDS)	ICSC 0793

Related compounds
Other anions	Iron(II) sulfide Iron(II) selenide Iron(II) telluride
Other cations	Manganese(II) oxide Cobalt(II) oxide
Related Iron oxides	Iron(II,III) oxide Iron(III) oxide
Related compounds	Iron(II) fluoride
- Except where otherwise noted, data are given for materials in their standard state (at 25 °C [77 °F], 100 kPa). verify (what is ?) Infobox references

Iron(II) oxide or ferrous oxide is the inorganic compound with the formula FeO. Its mineral form is known as wüstite. One of several iron oxides, it is a black-colored powder that is sometimes confused with rust, the latter of which consists of hydrated iron(III) oxide (ferric oxide). Iron(II) oxide also refers to a family of related non-stoichiometric compounds, which are typically iron deficient with compositions ranging from Fe_{0.84}O to Fe_{0.95}O.

== Occurrence ==
Iron(II) oxide makes up approximately 9% of the Earth's mantle. Within the mantle, it may be electrically conductive, which is a possible explanation for perturbations in Earth's rotation not accounted for by accepted models of the mantle's properties.

== Structure ==
Iron(II) oxide adopts the cubic, rock salt structure, where iron atoms are octahedrally coordinated by oxygen atoms and the oxygen atoms octahedrally coordinated by iron atoms. The non-stoichiometry occurs because of the ease of oxidation of Fe^{II} to Fe^{III} effectively replacing a small portion of Fe^{II} with two-thirds their number of Fe^{III}, which take up tetrahedral positions in the close packed oxide lattice.

In contrast to the crystalline solid, in the molten state iron atoms are coordinated by predominantly 4 or 5 oxygen atoms.

Below 200 K there is a minor change to the structure which changes the symmetry to rhombohedral and samples become antiferromagnetic.

== Preparation ==
FeO can be prepared by the thermal decomposition of iron(II) oxalate.

FeC_{2}O_{4} → FeO + CO_{2} + CO

The procedure is conducted under an inert atmosphere to avoid the formation of iron(III) oxide (Fe_{2}O_{3}). A similar procedure can also be used for the synthesis of manganous oxide and stannous oxide.

Stoichiometric FeO can be prepared by heating Fe_{0.95}O with metallic iron at 770 °C and 36 kbar.

== Uses ==
Iron(II) oxide is used as a pigment. It is FDA-approved for use in cosmetics and it is used in some tattoo inks. It can also be used as a phosphate remover from home aquaria.

== Reactions ==
FeO is thermodynamically unstable below 575 °C, tending to disproportionate to metal and Fe_{3}O_{4}:

4 FeO → Fe + Fe_{3}O_{4}

== See also ==
- Iron(II) hydroxide
- Iron(II)
