= Brucite =

Magnesium hydroxide mineral

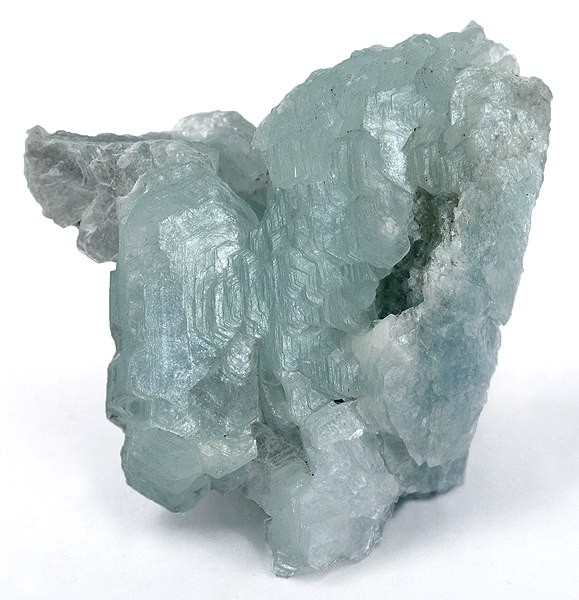

General
- Category: Oxide mineral
- Formula: Mg(OH)_{2}
- IMA symbol: Brc
- Strunz classification: 4.FE.05
- Crystal system: Trigonal
- Crystal class: Hexagonal crystal family (3̅m); H-M symbol: (3̅ 2/m)
- Space group: P3̅m1
- Unit cell: a = 3.142(1) Å, c = 4.766(2) Å; Z = 1

Identification
- Color: White, pale green, blue, gray; honey-yellow to brownish red
- Crystal habit: Tabular crystals; platy or foliated masses and rosettes – fibrous to massive
- Cleavage: Perfect on {0001}
- Fracture: Irregular
- Tenacity: Sectile
- Mohs scale hardness: 2.5 to 3
- Luster: Vitreous to pearly
- Streak: White
- Diaphaneity: Transparent
- Specific gravity: 2.39 to 2.40
- Optical properties: Uniaxial (+)
- Refractive index: n_{ω} = 1.56–1.59 n_{ε} = 1.58–1.60
- Birefringence: 0.02
- Other characteristics: Pyroelectric

Brucite is the mineral form of magnesium hydroxide, with the chemical formula Mg(OH)_{2}. It is a common alteration product of periclase in marble; a low-temperature hydrothermal vein mineral in metamorphosed limestones and chlorite schists; and formed during serpentinization of dunites. Brucite is often found in association with serpentine, calcite, aragonite, dolomite, magnesite, hydromagnesite, artinite, talc and chrysotile.

It adopts a layered CdI_{2}-like structure with hydrogen-bonds between the layers.

== Discovery ==
Brucite was first described in 1824 by François Sulpice Beudant and named for the discoverer, American mineralogist, Archibald Bruce (1777–1818). A fibrous variety of brucite is called nemalite. It occurs in fibers or laths, usually elongated along [1010], but sometimes [1120] crystalline directions.

== Occurrence ==
A notable location in the US is Wood's Chrome Mine, Cedar Hill Quarry, Lancaster County, Pennsylvania. Yellow, white and blue brucite with a botryoidal habit was discovered in Qila Saifullah District of Province Baluchistan, Pakistan. In a later discovery, brucite also occurred in the Bela Ophiolite of Wadh, Khuzdar District, Province Baluchistan, Pakistan. Brucite has also occurred from South Africa, Italy, Russia, Canada, and other localities as well, but the most notable discoveries are the US, Russian and Pakistani examples.

== Industrial applications ==
Synthetic brucite is mainly consumed as a precursor to magnesia (MgO), a useful refractory and thermal insulator. It finds some use as a flame retardant because it thermally decomposes to release water in a similar way to aluminium hydroxide (Al(OH)_{3}) and mixtures of huntite (Mg_{3}Ca(CO_{3})_{4}) and hydromagnesite (Mg_{5}(CO_{3})_{4}(OH)_{2}·4H_{2}O). It also constitutes a significant source of magnesium for industry. Although generally deemed safe, brucite can be contaminated with naturally occurring asbestos fibers.

== Degradation of cement and concrete ==
When cement or concrete are exposed to Mg^{2+} and SO^{2−}_{4} ions simultaneously present in seawater, the precipitation of the poorly soluble brucite contributes to enhance the formation of gypsum in the sulfate attack:

MgSO_{4} + Ca(OH)_{2} + 2 H_{2}O → Mg(OH)_{2} + CaSO_{4} · 2H_{2}O

The precipitation of insoluble Mg(OH)_{2} helps to considerably drive the chemical equilibrium of the reaction to the right. It exacerbates the sulfate attack resulting in the formation of gypsum and ettringite (an expansive phase) responsible for the mechanical stress in the hardened cement paste. However, brucite, a phase with a small molar volume (24.63 cm^{3}/mol), may contribute to clogging the porous network in the hardened cement paste, hindering the diffusion of these harmful reactive species in the cement matrix. This can delay the decalcification of the C-S-H phase (the "glue" phase in the hardened cement paste responsible for the cohesion in concrete) and its transformation into an M-S-H phase.

The exact mechanism of brucite degradation of hardened cement paste remains a matter of debate. If brucite had a high molar volume, it could be de facto considered a swelling phase (like ettringite, or highly hydrated minerals), but this does not appear to be the case. It is unclear if it causes expansion or not, and how. If it replaces another phase locally (topo chemical replacement), in cases where its molar volume is smaller than that of the phase it replaces, no expansion is expected; rather, a decrease in porosity is anticipated. However, if it crystallizes in a large number of tiny crystals growing between existing ones, even with a small molar volume, it could exert a considerable crystallization pressure in the cement matrix, resulting in tensile stress, expansion and cracking.

Anyway, prolonged contact between seawater, or naturally rich Mg-brines, and concrete may induce durability issues for regularly immersed concrete structures, and their components, especially if they also contain steel reinforcements (pitting corrosion caused by chloride ions).

The use of dolomite as aggregate in concrete made with a cement with a too high alkali content can also cause brucite precipitation, driving the dedolomitization reaction, as observed in the alkali-aggregate reaction.

Ca,Mg(CO_{3})_{2} + 2 NaOH → Mg(OH)_{2} + CaCO_{3} + Na_{2}CO_{3}

Consequently, the use of dolomite is prohibited as aggregate for concrete.

== Gallery ==
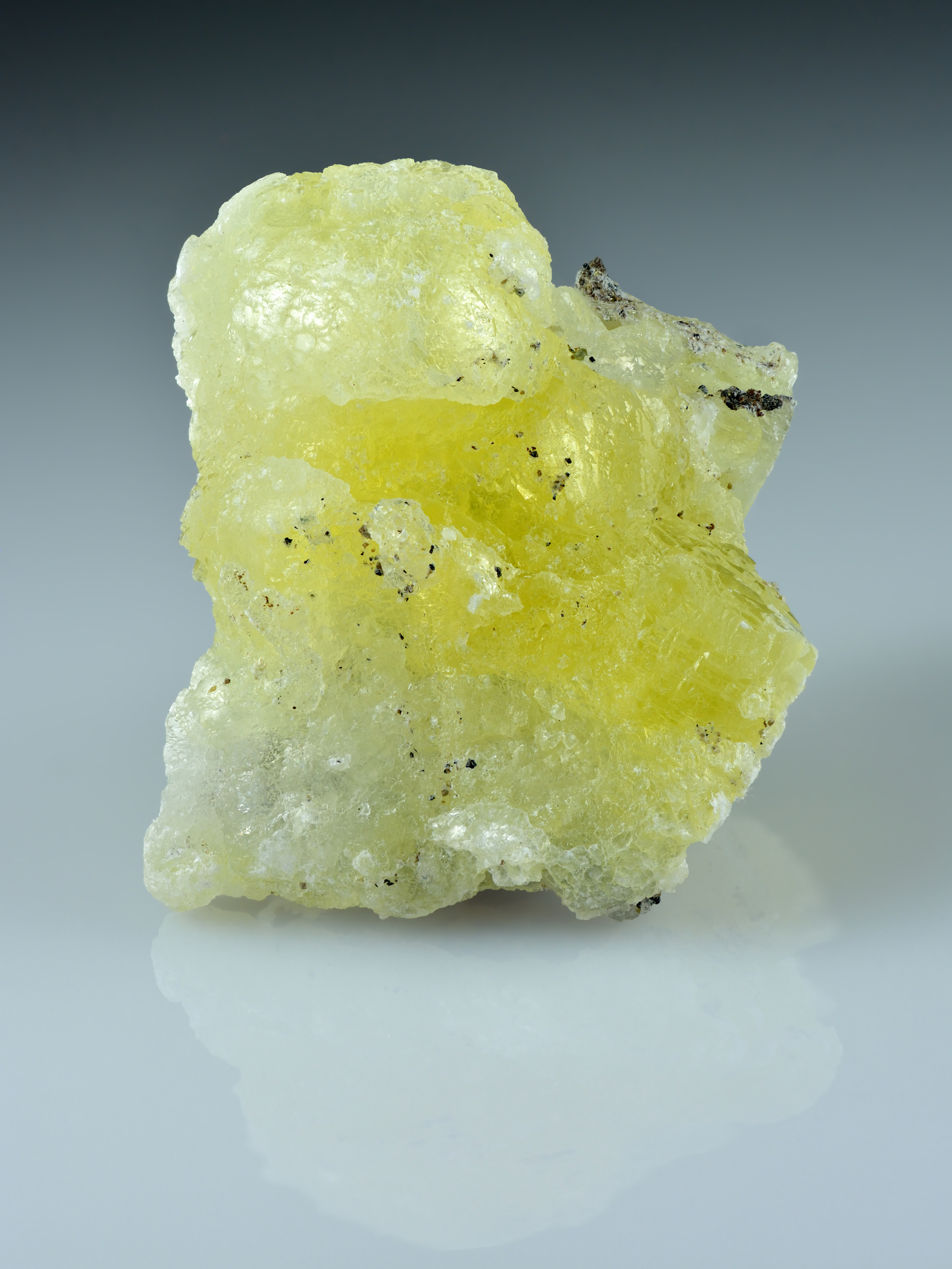
Yellow brucite from Balochistan, Pakistan

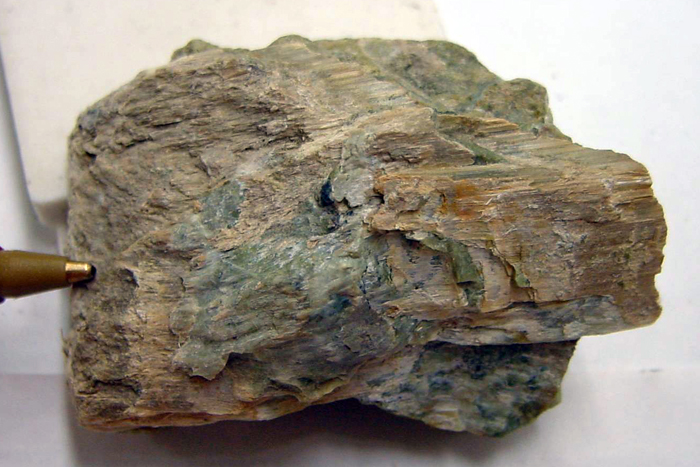
Nemalite

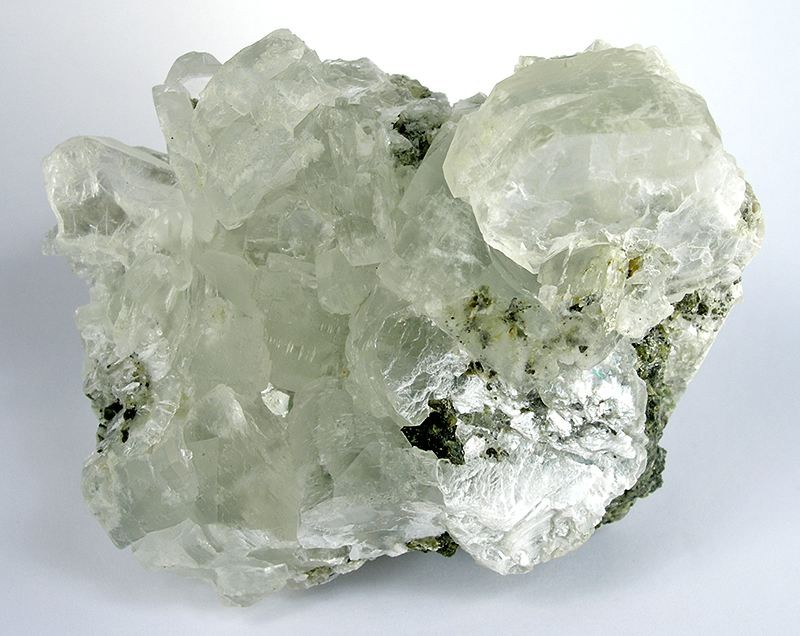
Brucite crystals from the Sverdlovsk Region, Urals, Russia (size: 10.5 x 7.8 x 7.4 cm)

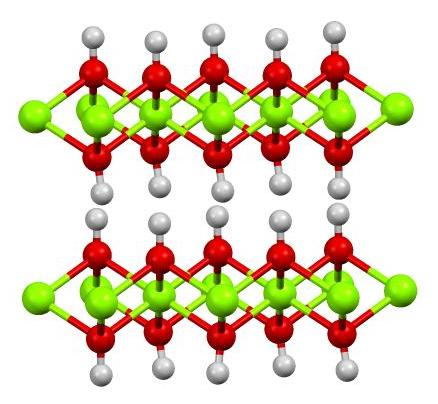
Structure of Mg(OH)_{2}

== See also ==
- List of minerals
- List of minerals named after people
- Portlandite, Ca(OH)_{2}
- Cookeite, LiAl_{4}(Si_{3}Al)O_{10}(OH)_{8}
