= Pelorus Jack (HMS New Zealand mascot) =

War dog (1943–1957)

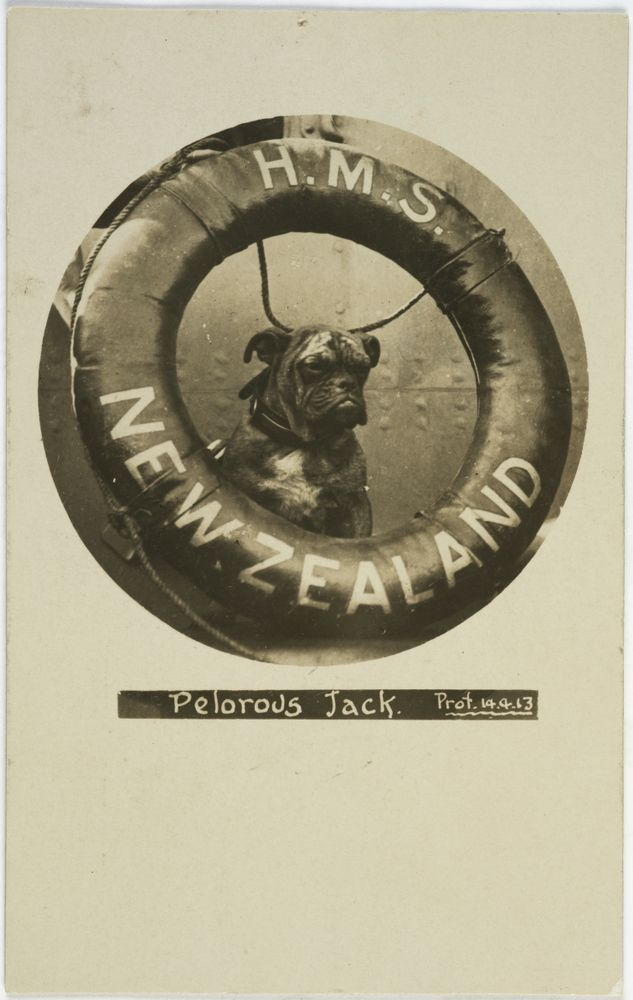
Pelorus Jack I (1913)

Pelorus Jack was the name of two bulldogs who were mascots of the Royal Navy ship HMS New Zealand from 1913 to 1919. The first Pelorus Jack died in 1916 and was replaced by Pelorus Jack II, who died in 1920.

== Biography ==
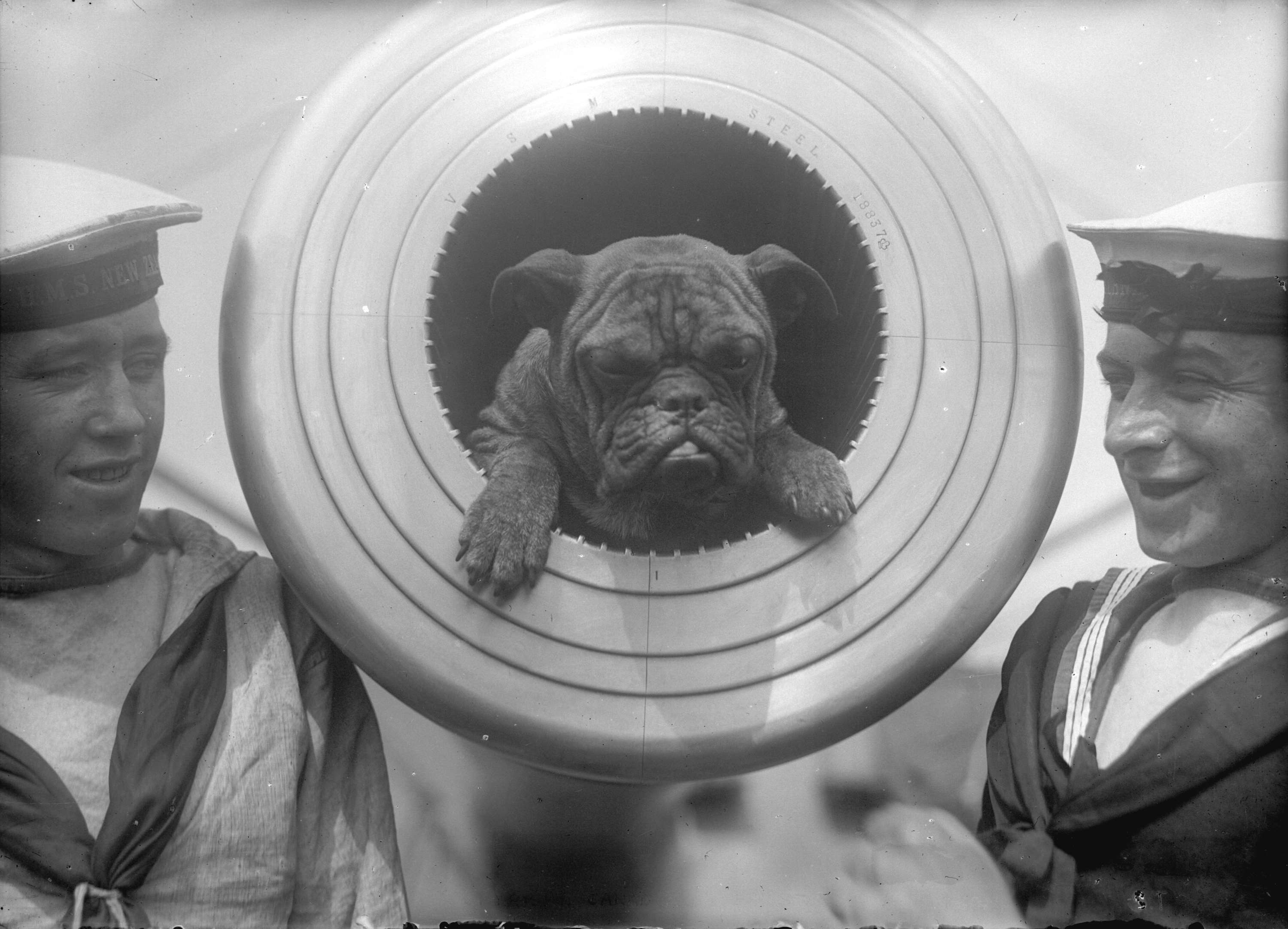
Pelorus Jack in the muzzle of a 12-in gun (1913)

Pelorus Jack was a puppy when he was donated to HMS New Zealand by a New Zealander living in England, Mr J. Pomeroy. He was named after Pelorus Jack, a Risso's dolphin that famously led ships through the Cook Strait from 1888 to 1912.

On 5 February 1913, King George V visited and inspected HMS New Zealand and met Pelorus Jack. He sailed on the ship's maiden voyage in 1913. During a port visit to Johannesburg, South Africa, a ceremony was held in which Pelorus Jack was presented with a studded collar. The studs spelt out the word "Onward" and were accompanied by the inscription "Pelorus Jack, HMS New Zealand, from New Zealanders in the Transvaal, March 1913." In Wellington a local Boy Scout brigade presented him with a hei-tiki, which was attached to his collar.

Pelorus Jack lived aboard HMS New Zealand from 1913 to 1916, becoming a loyal and much loved companion for the crew. He was present during the Battle of Heligoland Bight, the first Anglo-German naval engagement of World War I.

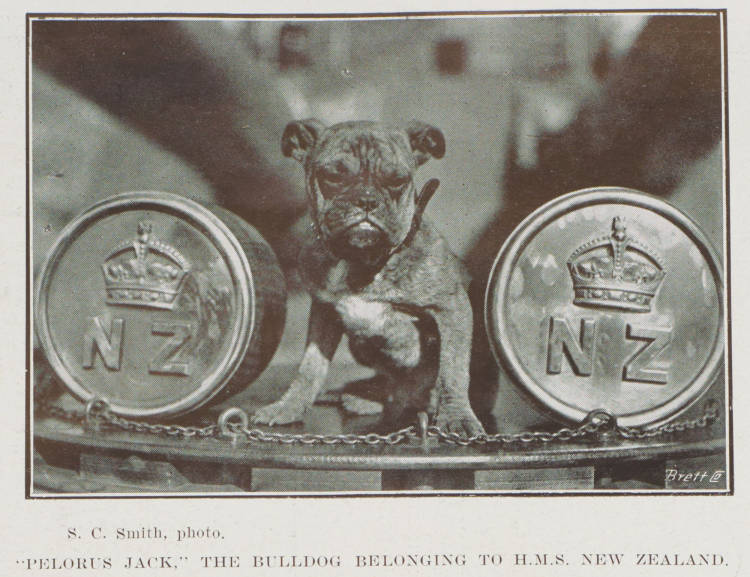
"'Pelorus Jack,' the bulldog belonging to H.M.S. New Zealand"

Pelorus Jack died in an accident on board, falling down the ship's forward funnel. On 24 April 1916, he was "discharged dead" by the Royal Navy. His death was reported:

The mascot, Pelorus Jack, a bulldog puppy, came to an untimely death by falling down the funnel casing and being burnt to death. His loss is mourned by the men, who had become very attached to the dog, as he was on deck barking at the shells all through the two engagements, and he was to have been presented with a medal. It is believed that the New Zealanders in England are going to present the ship with another mascot, as a little black kitten is the only pet they have now.

The New Zealand History website states that it is not known how Pelorus Jack reached the top of a funnel, "but his demise was probably not accidental".

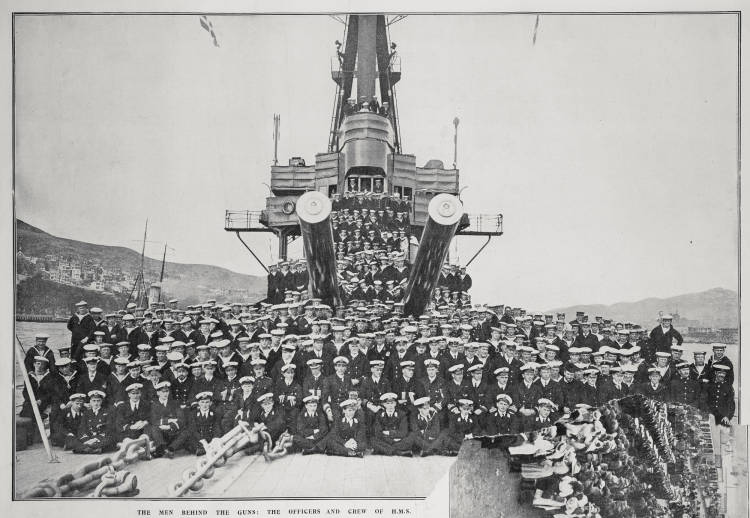
The crew of HMS New Zealand in 1913. Pelorus Jack is in the centre of the second row, with Commander Grace.

== Pelorus Jack II ==
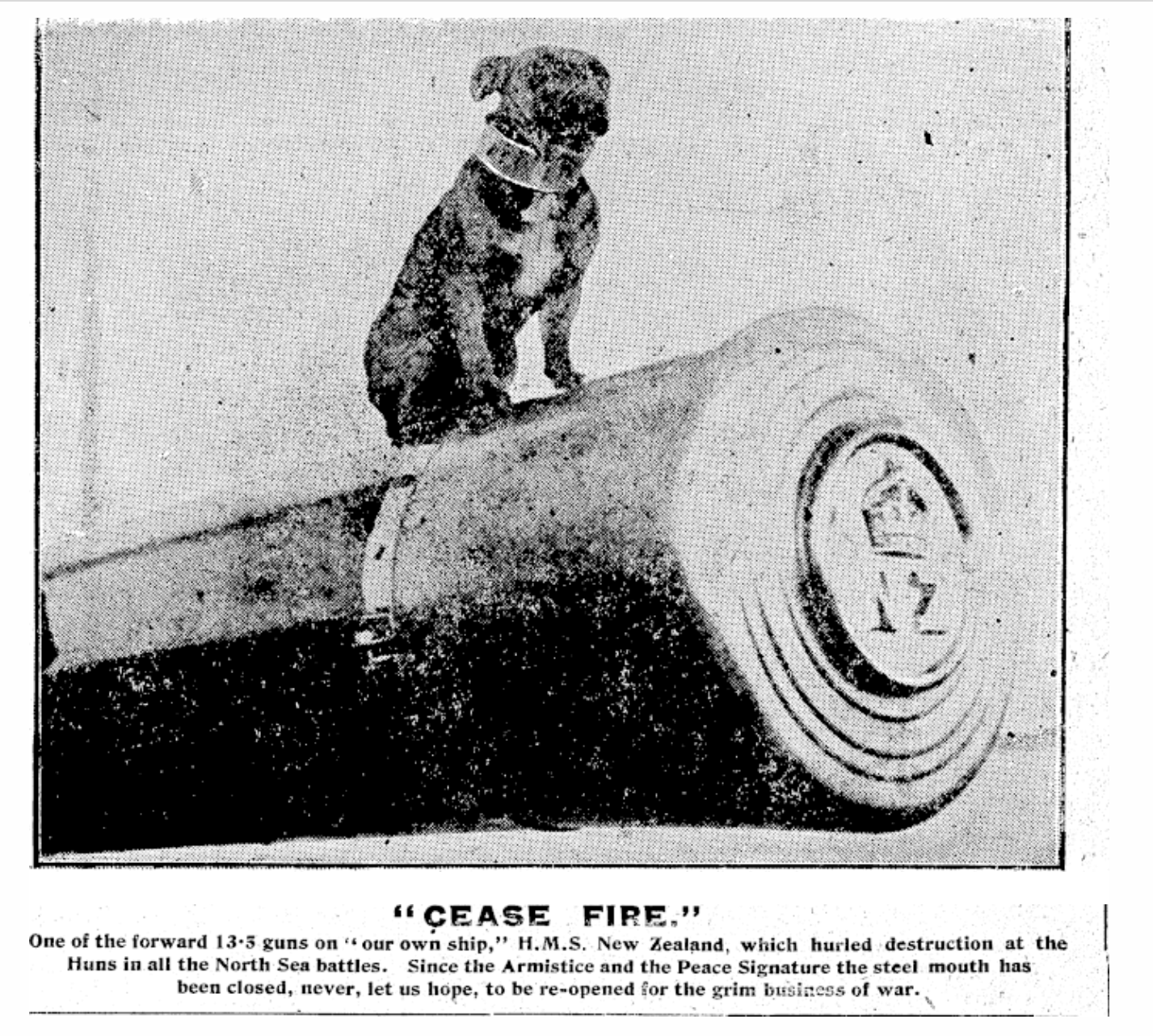
Pelorus Jack II, 1919

Following Pelorus Jack's death, a "will" was found in which he expressed a desire to be succeeded by a "bull pup of honest parentage, clean habits and moral tendencies" and not a "Dachshund or other dog of Teutonic extraction". Accordingly, he was replaced by another bulldog, Pelorus Jack II.

Pelorus Jack II was ranked leading sea dog, serving during the Battle of Jutland. He was trained to take refuge when he heard guns firing. However, after the battle, he grew increasingly scared of the sound of gunfire, bolting when loud noises were made.

Upon the end of World War I, Captain O. E. Leggett gave the dog to the city of Auckland, entrusting him to Deputy Mayor Andrew Entrican. He was discharged from the Royal Navy and was sent to a quarantine facility on Motuihe Island. While in quarantine, he died from an unforeseen illness.

== Legacy ==
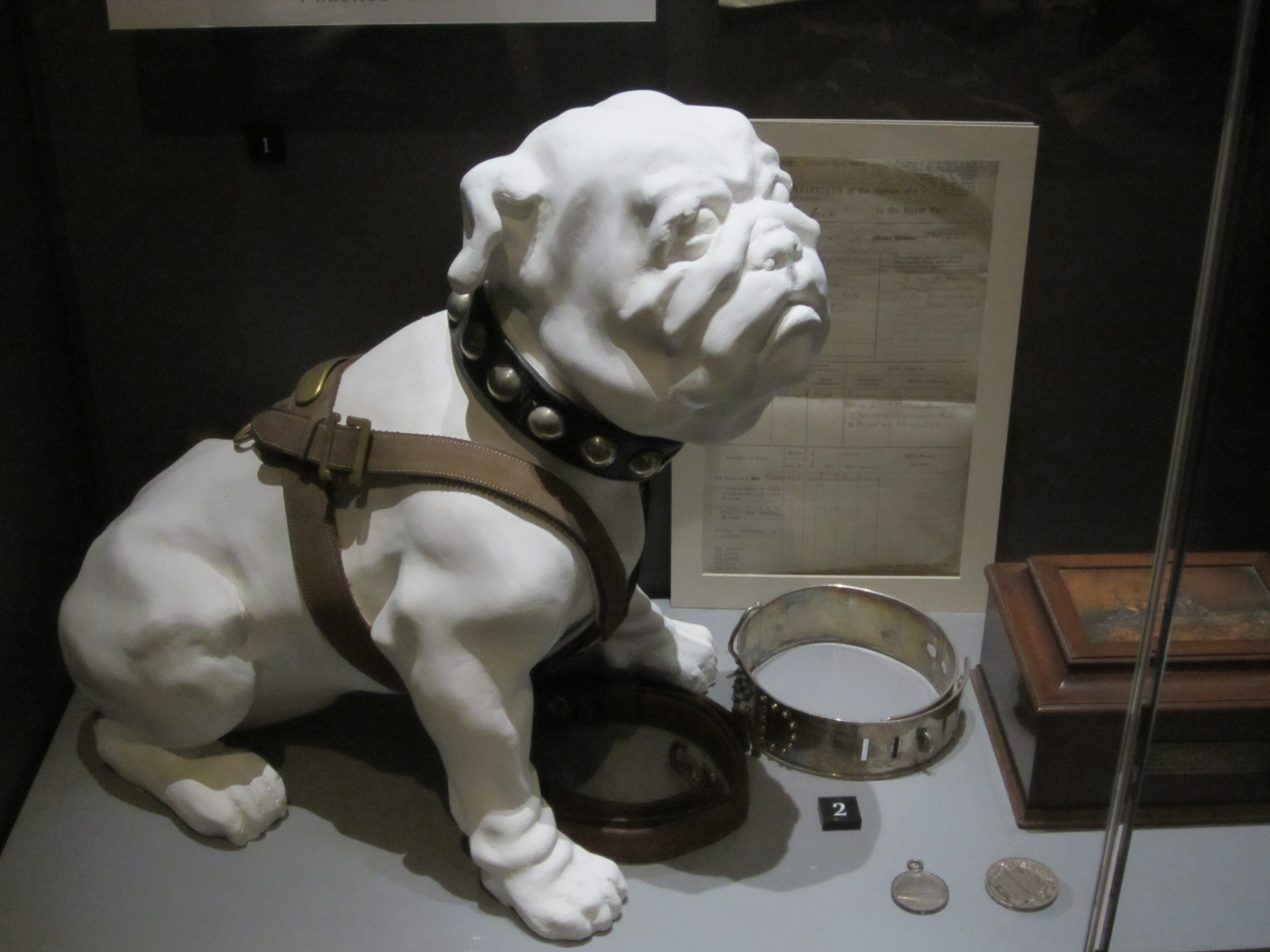
Statue of Pelorus Jack at the Auckland Museum

The two bulldogs served as pets for sailors, boosting morale and providing companionship during trying times.

Pelorus Jack was presented with two collars during his service. One is part of the collection of the Auckland War Memorial Museum and can be seen in the permanent exhibition Scars on the Heart. The other is in the collection of the Torpedo Bay Navy Museum.
