= Hei-tiki =

Ornamental pendant of the Māori of New Zealand

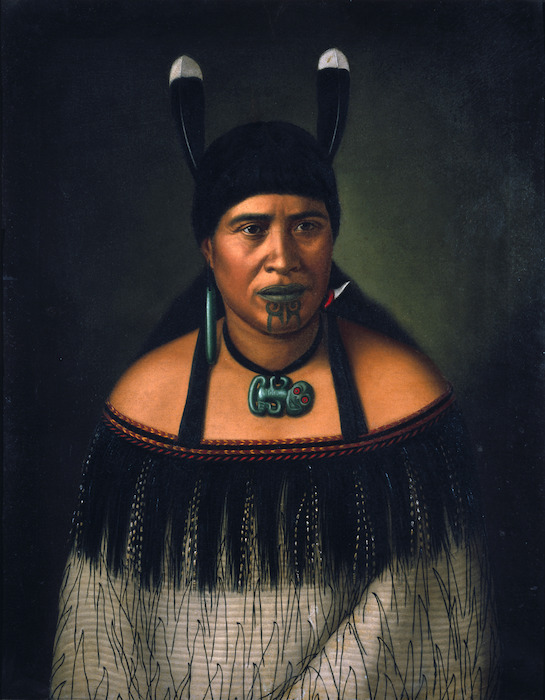
Hinepare, a woman of the Ngāti Kahungunu tribe, wearing a hei-tiki

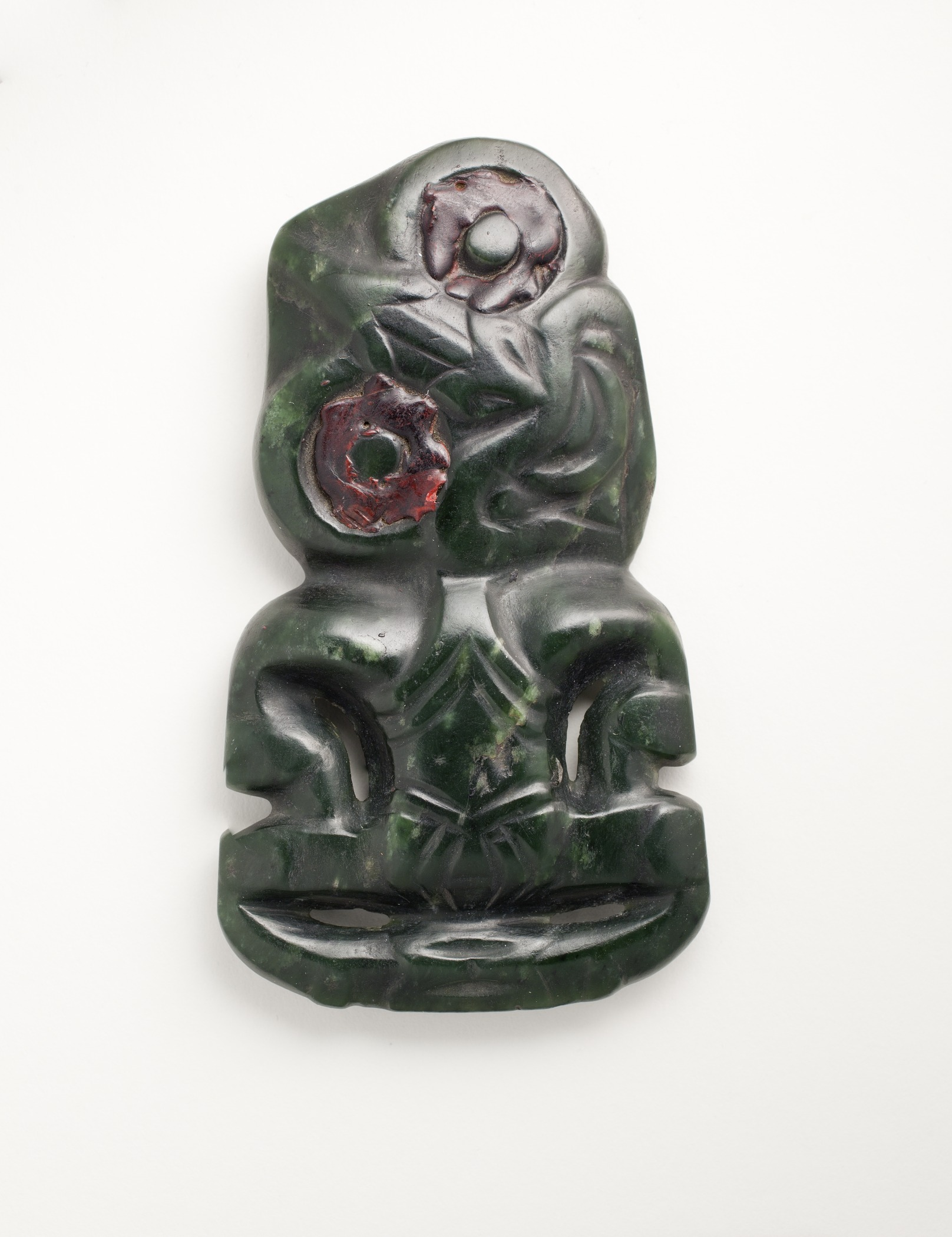
Hei-tiki; circa 18th century; nephrite and haliotis shell; height: 10.9 cm (4 1/4 in.); from New Zealand; Los Angeles County Museum of Art (USA)

The hei-tiki (Māori pronunciation: [hɛi ˈtiki], New Zealand English: /heɪˈtɪki/) is an ornamental pendant of the Māori of New Zealand. Hei-tiki are usually made of pounamu (greenstone), and are considered a taonga (treasure) by Māori. They are commonly called tiki by New Zealanders, a term that originally refers to the first mortal. (The word hei in Māori can mean "to wear around the neck".)

Retailers sell tourist versions of hei-tiki throughout New Zealand—these can be made from jade, other types of stone, plastic, or other materials.

== Origins and materials ==
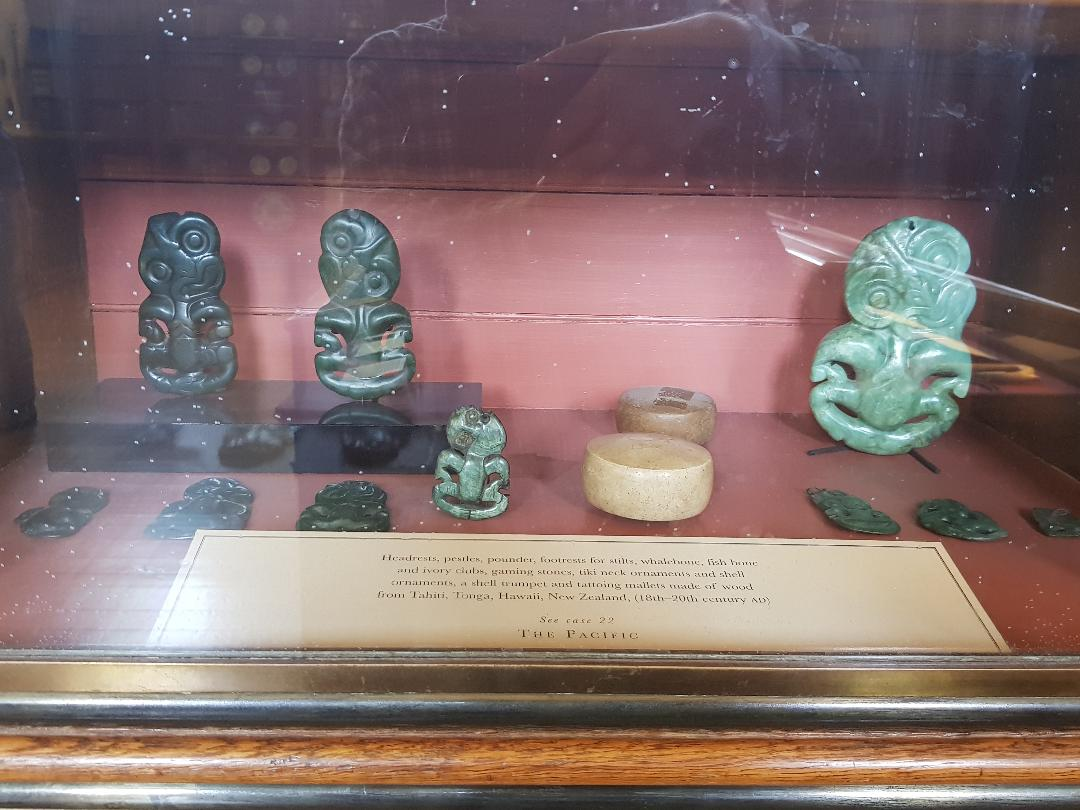
Examples of hei-tiki in the British Museum

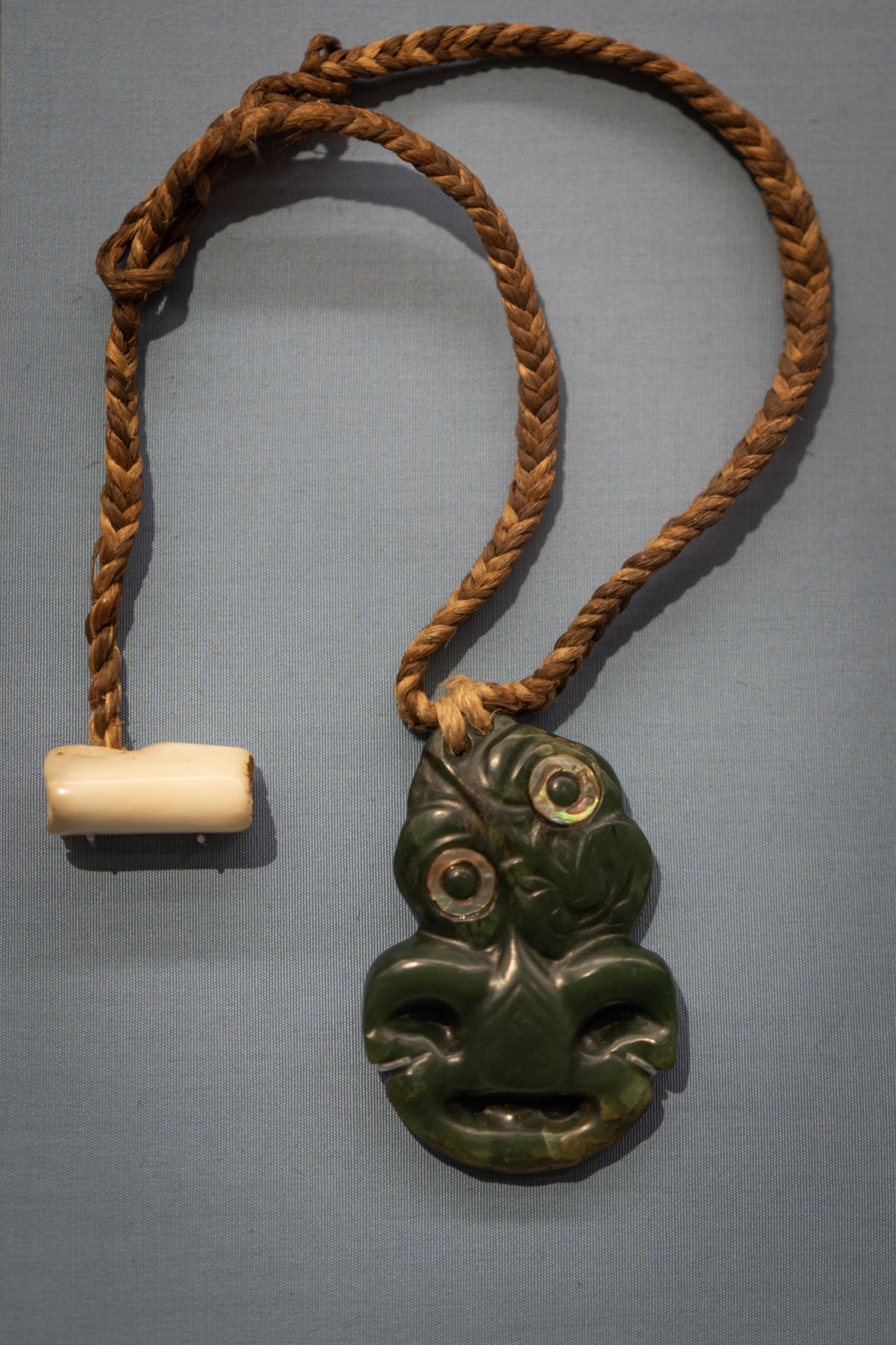
Another example from the British Museum

One theory of the origin of the hei-tiki suggests a connection with Tiki, the first man in Māori legend. According to Horatio Gordon Robley, author of A History of the Maori Tiki, there are two main ideas behind the symbolism of hei-tiki: they are either memorials to ancestors, or represent the goddess of childbirth, Hineteiwaiwa. The rationale behind the first theory is that they were often buried when their kaitiaki (guardian) died and retrieved later to be placed somewhere special and brought out in times of tangihanga (mourning and associated activities). Because of the connection with Hineteiwaiwa, hei-tiki were often given to a woman by her husband's family if she was having trouble conceiving.

The most valuable hei-tiki are carved from pounamu which is either nephrite or bowenite (Māori: tangiwai). Pounamu is esteemed highly by Māori for its beauty, toughness and great hardness; it is used not only for ornaments such as hei-tiki and ear pendants, but also for carving tools, adzes and weapons. Named varieties include translucent green kahurangi, whitish inanga, semi-transparent kawakawa, and tangiwai or bowenite.

A 2014 thesis by Dougal Austin supervised by Peter Adds, based on a survey of the collection of hei-tiki at Te Papa Tongarewa and early-contact examples in foreign collections, found that the mana of hei-tiki is derived from the "agency of prolonged ancestral use" and stylistically was "highly developed ... from the outset to conform to adze-shaped pieces of pounamu."

Examples of hei-tiki are found in museum collections around the world. The Museum of New Zealand Te Papa Tongarewa (over 200) and the British Museum (about 50) have two of the largest collections, some of which were exchanged or gifted to European travellers and sailors at the earliest point of contact between the two cultures,, while the majority were stolen or improperly obtained through colonial processes.

== Types ==
Traditionally there were several types of hei-tiki which varied widely in form. Modern-day hei-tiki, however, may be divided into two types. The first type is rather delicate with a head/body ratio of approximately 30/70 and small details such as ears, elbows and knees. The head is on a tilt, with one hand placed on the thigh, and the other on the chest. The eyes are relatively small. The second type is generally heavier than the first. It has a 40/60 head/body ratio, both hands are on the thighs, and the eyes are proportionately larger.

== Manufacture ==
From the size and style of traditional examples of hei-tiki, it is likely that the stone was first cut in the form of a small adze. The tilted head of the ptīau variety of hei-tiki derives from the properties of the stone – its hardness and great value make it important to minimize the amount of the stone that has to be removed. Creating a hei-tiki with traditional methods is a long, arduous process during which the stone is smoothed by abrasive rubbing; finally, using sticks and water, it is slowly shaped and the holes bored out. After laborious and lengthy polishing, the completed pendant is suspended by a plaited cord and secured by a loop and toggle.

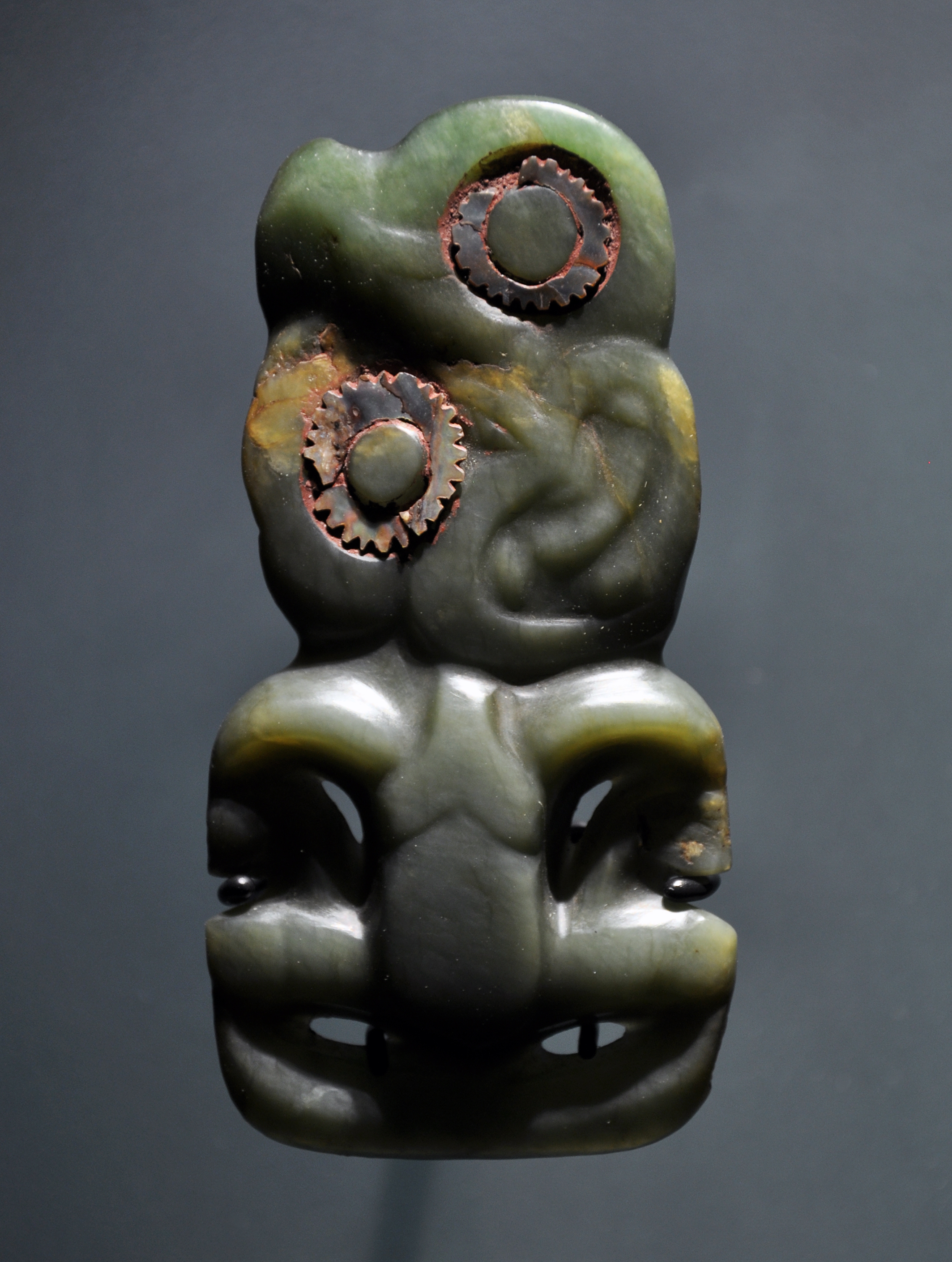
Pounamu (greenstone) hei tiki ornamented with pāua (abalone) shell and pigments, 1500–1850.

== Current popularity ==
Among the other taonga (treasured possessions) used as items of personal adornment are bone carvings in the form of earrings or necklaces. For many Māori the wearing of such items relates to Māori cultural identity. They are also popular with young New Zealanders of all backgrounds for whom the pendants relate to a more generalized sense of New Zealand identity. Several artistic collectives have been established by Māori tribal groups. These collectives have begun creating and exporting jewellery (such as bone carved pendants based on traditional fishhooks hei matau and other greenstone jewellery) and other artistic items (such as wood carvings and textiles). Several actors who have recently appeared in high-profile movies filmed in New Zealand have come back wearing such jewellery, including Viggo Mortensen of The Lord of the Rings fame who took to wearing a hei matau around his neck. These trends have contributed towards a worldwide interest in traditional Māori culture and arts such as Kiri Nathan including pounamu jewellery in her 2013 London Fashion Week exhibition.

The captain of HMS New Zealand, a battlecruiser funded in 1911 by the government of New Zealand for the defence of the British Empire and which took an active part in three battles of the First World War, wore into battle a hei-tiki (as well as a piupiu, Māori warrior's skirt). The crew attributed to this the New Zealand being a "lucky ship" which sustained no casualties during the entire war.

== In popular culture ==
The mockumentary film Hei Tiki was released in 1935, with a New York Times review describing the plot as being about a "chieftain's daughter who is declared tabu and destined to be the bride of the war god", attributing the title to mean "love charm" (a Hei-tiki pendant interpretation).

The crime writer Ngaio Marsh gives prominence to an amuletic hei-tiki (which she calls simply a tiki) in her 1937 novel Vintage Murder. She emphasises its aspect as a promoter of fertility.

== See also ==
- Hei matau
- Lingling-o
- Manaia (mythological creature)
