= HMS New Zealand (1911) =

Indefatigable-class battlecruiser

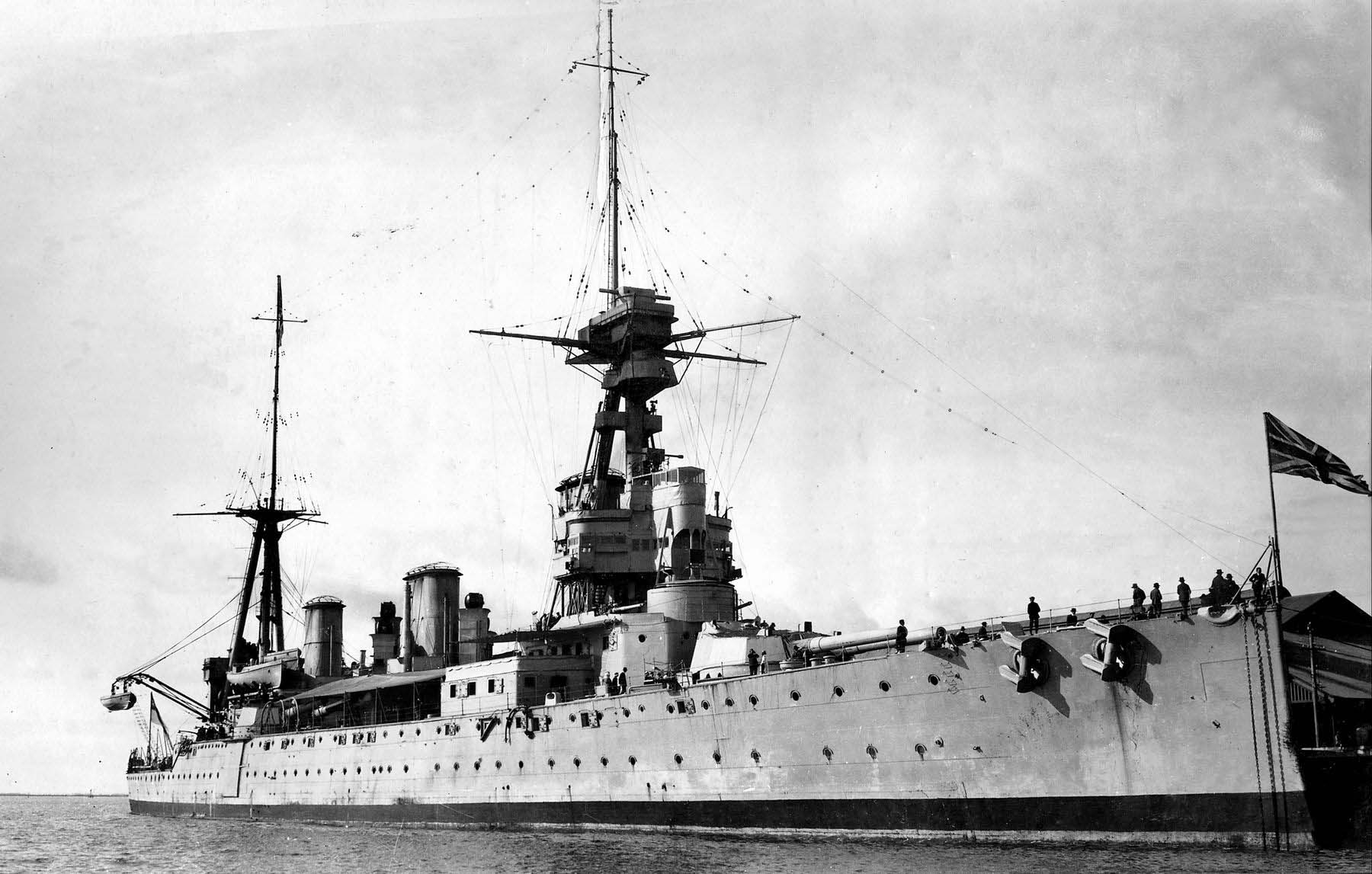
- New Zealand in Australia, May 1919

History

United Kingdom
- Name: New Zealand
- Namesake: Dominion of New Zealand
- Builder: Fairfield Shipbuilding and Engineering, Govan
- Laid down: 20 June 1910
- Launched: 1 July 1911
- Commissioned: 19 November 1912
- Stricken: 19 December 1922
- Fate: Sold for scrap, 22 January 1923

General characteristics
- Class & type: Indefatigable-class battlecruiser
- Displacement: 18,500 long tons (18,800 t) at normal load
- Length: 590 ft 3.5 in (179.9 m)
- Beam: 80 ft (24.4 m)
- Draught: 27 ft (8.2 m)
- Installed power: 31 × Babcock & Wilcox boilers; 44,000 shp (33,000 kW)
- Propulsion: 4 × shafts; 2 × steam turbine sets
- Speed: 25 knots (46 km/h; 29 mph)
- Range: 3,340 nmi (6,190 km; 3,840 mi) at 23.5 knots (43.5 km/h; 27.0 mph)
- Complement: 818 (1913), 853 (1919), 1070 (1921)
- Armament: 4 × twin 12 in (305 mm) guns; 16 × single 4 in (102 mm) guns; 2 × single 18 in (450 mm) torpedo tubes.
- Armour: Belt: 4–6 in (102–152 mm); Decks: 1.5–2.5 in (38–64 mm); Turrets: 7 in (178 mm)

HMS New Zealand was one of three Indefatigable-class battlecruisers. Launched in 1911, the ship was funded by the government of New Zealand as a gift to Britain, and she was commissioned into the Royal Navy in 1912. She had been intended for the China Station, but was released by the New Zealand government at the request of the Admiralty for service in British waters.

During 1913, New Zealand was sent on a ten-month tour of the British Dominions, with an emphasis on a visit to her namesake nation. She was back in British waters at the start of the First World War, and operated as part of the Royal Navy's Grand Fleet, in opposition to the German High Seas Fleet. The battlecruiser participated in all three of the major North Sea battles—Heligoland Bight, Dogger Bank, and Jutland—and was involved in the response to the inconclusive Raid on Scarborough, and the Second Battle of Heligoland Bight. New Zealand contributed to the destruction of two cruisers and was hit by enemy fire only once, sustaining no casualties; her status as a "lucky ship" was attributed by the crew to a Māori piupiu (warrior's skirt) and hei-tiki (pendant) worn by the captain during battle.

After the war, New Zealand was sent on a second world tour, this time to allow Admiral John Jellicoe to review the naval defences of the Dominions. In 1920, the battlecruiser was placed in reserve. She was broken up for scrap in 1922 to meet the United Kingdom's tonnage limit in the disarmament provisions of the Washington Naval Treaty.

== Design ==
The Indefatigable class was not a significant improvement on the preceding Invincible class; the main difference was the enlargement of the dimensions to give the ships' two wing turrets a wider arc of fire. The ships were smaller and not as well protected as the contemporary German battlecruiser SMS Von der Tann and subsequent German designs. While Von der Tann's characteristics were not known when the lead ship of the class, Indefatigable, was laid down in February 1909, the Royal Navy obtained accurate information on the German ship before work began on New Zealand and her sister ship HMAS Australia.

Starboard elevation and deck plan as depicted in Brassey's Naval Annual, 1915. Note: plan is of Invincible-class battlecruisers; the Indefatigable-class had a third superstructure element with 'P' & 'Q' turrets more widely spaced.

New Zealand had an overall length of 590 feet (179.8 m), a beam of 80 feet (24.4 m), and a draught of 29 feet 9 inches (9.1 m) at deep load. The ship displaced 18,500 long tons (18,800 t) at load and 22,130 long tons (22,490 t) at deep load. She initially had a crew of 818 officers and ratings, though this was to increase in subsequent years. At the time of her visit to New Zealand in 1913 the engineering department had a staff of 335.

The ship was powered by two sets of Parsons direct-drive steam turbines, each driving two propeller shafts using steam provided by 31 coal-burning Babcock & Wilcox boilers. The turbines were rated at 44,000 shaft horsepower (33,000 kW) and were intended to give the ship a maximum speed of 25 knots (46 km/h; 29 mph). However, during trials in 1912, the turbines produced over 49,000 shp (37,000 kW), which allowed New Zealand to reach 26.39 knots (48.87 km/h; 30.37 mph). The ship carried enough coal and fuel oil to give her a range of 6,690 nautical miles (12,390 km; 7,700 mi) at a speed of 10 knots (19 km/h; 12 mph).

The ship carried eight BL 12-inch Mk X guns in four twin gun turrets. Two turrets were mounted fore and aft on the centreline, identified as 'A' and 'X' respectively. The other two were wing turrets mounted amidships and staggered diagonally: 'P' was forward and to port of the centre funnel, while 'Q' was situated starboard and aft. Each wing turret had a limited ability to fire to the opposite side, but if the ship was full broadside to her target she could bring all eight main guns to bear. Her secondary armament consisted of sixteen 4-inch BL Mk VII guns positioned in the superstructure. She mounted two 18-inch (450 mm) submerged torpedo tubes, one on each side aft of 'X' barbette, and twelve torpedoes were carried.

The Indefatigables were protected by a waterline 4–6-inch (102–152 mm) armoured belt that extended between and covered the end barbettes. Their armoured deck ranged in thickness between 1.5 and 2.5 inches (38 and 64 mm) with the thickest portions protecting the steering gear in the stern. The turret faces were 7 inches (178 mm) thick, and the turrets were supported by barbettes of the same thickness.

New Zealand's 'A' turret was fitted with a 9-foot (2.7 m) rangefinder at the rear of the turret roof. It was also equipped to control the entire main armament in the event that the normal fire control positions were knocked out or communication between the primary positions and the gun layers was disabled.

=== Wartime modifications ===
The ship was fitted with a single QF 6 pounder Hotchkiss anti-aircraft (AA) gun from October 1914 to the end of 1915. In March 1915, a single QF 3 inch 20 cwt (Note: "cwt" is the abbreviation for hundredweight, 20 cwt referring to the weight of the gun.) AA gun was added. It was provided with 500 rounds. The battlecruiser's 4-inch guns were enclosed in casemates and given blast shields during a refit in November to better protect the gun crews from weather and enemy action. Two aft guns were removed at the same time.

New Zealand received a fire-control director sometime between mid-1915 and May 1916; this centralised fire control under the director officer. The turret crewmen merely had to follow pointers transmitted from the director to align their guns on the target. This greatly increased accuracy, as it was easier to spot the fall of shells and eliminated the problem of the ship's roll dispersing the shells when each turret fired independently.

To address deficiencies in the armour of British capital ships raised by the Battle of Jutland, New Zealand entered the dockyard in November 1916 where an additional inch of armour was added to selected horizontal areas of the main deck. In the forward part of the ship it covered the magazines for A-turret and the 4-inch guns; midships to cover the magazines for Q- and P-turrets, while it was extended vertically by 3 feet 6 inches (1.07 m) to protect the magazine trunks and escape shafts. During a refit in June 1917 the armour was again improved when 1-inch armour plate was added on the lower deck at the bottom of the inner and outer upper coal bunkers as well as over the boiler.

By 1918, New Zealand carried two aircraft, a Sopwith Pup and a Sopwith 1½ Strutter, on flying-off ramps fitted on top of 'P' and 'Q' turrets. The Pup was intended to shoot down Zeppelins while the 1½ Strutter was used for spotting and reconnaissance. Each platform had a canvas hangar to protect the aircraft during inclement weather.

=== Post-war modifications ===
In preparation for its role as Admiral Jellicoe's personal transport for his planned visit to Australia, Canada, India and New Zealand New Zealand was refitted between December 1918 and February 1919. The fore topmast and both top gallants were replaced. Her flying-off platforms were removed and new peacetime trim was installed. The range clocks were removed and the deflection scales on the turrets were painted over. The lower forward four-inch guns were removed and replaced with cabins on the port and starboard sides of the forward superstructure to house Jellicoe and provide offices for his staff of eight.

== Acquisition and construction ==
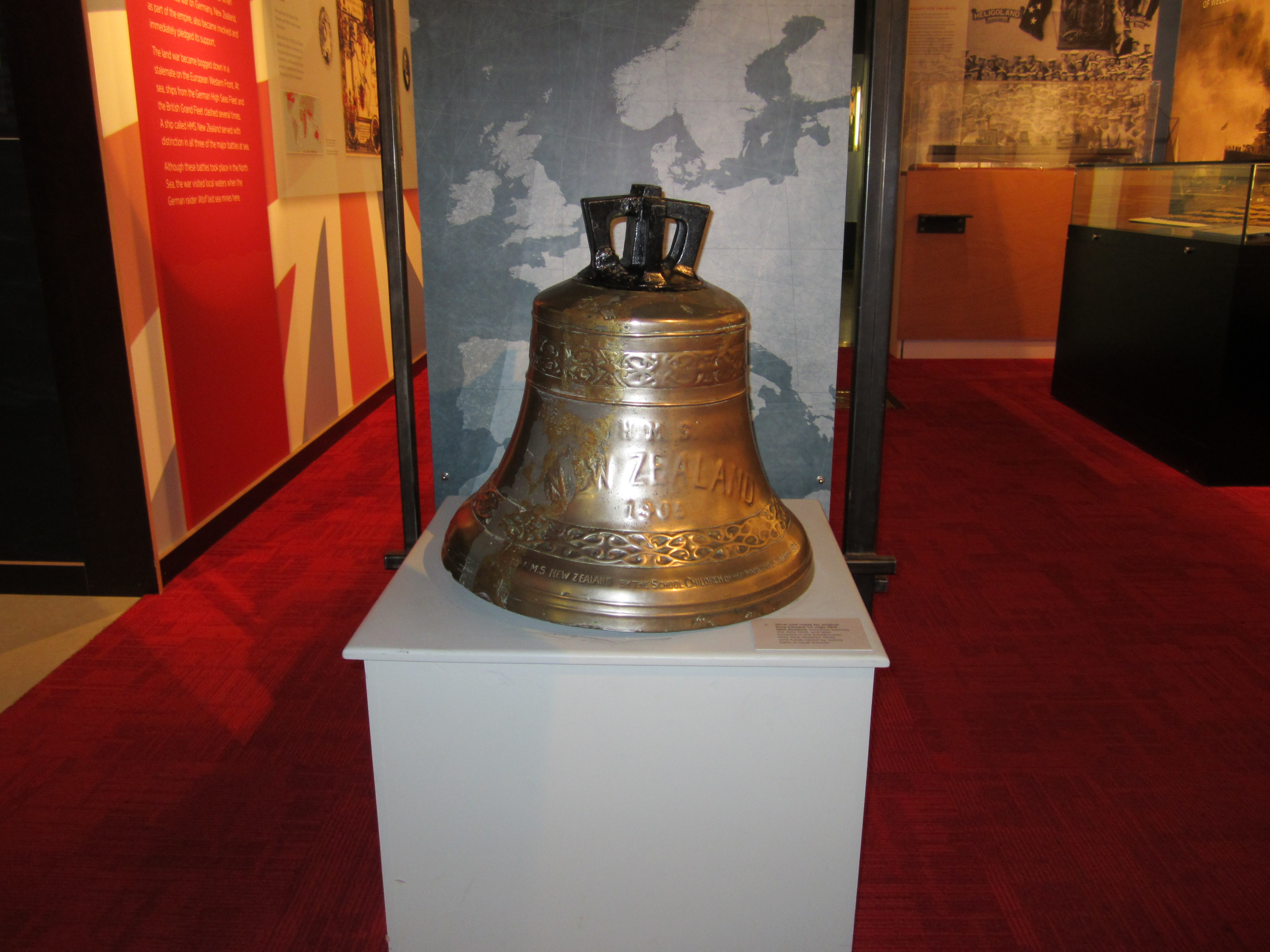
New Zealand's bell; this bell had previously been used on the battleship of the same name

At the start of the 20th century, the British Admiralty maintained that naval defence of the British Empire, including the Dominions, should be unified under the Royal Navy. Attitudes on this matter softened during the first decade, and at the 1909 Imperial Conference, the Admiralty proposed the creation of Fleet Units: forces consisting of a battlecruiser, three light cruisers, six destroyers, and three submarines. While Australia and Canada were encouraged to purchase fleet units to serve as the core of new national navies, other fleet units would be operated by the Royal Navy at distant bases, particularly in the Far East; New Zealand was asked to partially subsidise a fleet unit for the China Station.

To this end, the Prime Minister of New Zealand, Sir Joseph Ward, announced on 22 March 1909 that his country would fund a battleship (later changed to an Indefatigable-class battlecruiser) as an example to other countries. It is unclear why this design was selected, given that it was known to be inferior to the battlecruisers entering service with the Imperial German Navy (German: Kaiserliche Marine). Historian John Roberts has suggested that the request may have been attributable to the Royal Navy's practice of using small battleships and large cruisers as flagships of stations far from the United Kingdom, or it might have reflected the preferences of the First Sea Lord, Admiral of the Fleet John Fisher, preferences not widely shared. The New Zealand Government took out a loan to fund the cost of the ship.

When it came to naming the new ship the most obvious name was already being used by the existing King Edward VII-class battleship HMS New Zealand. It was decided to transfer the name to the new battlecruiser and to rename the older ship. Among the suggested names were Arawa, Caledonia, Wellington and Maori (which was already being used by a destroyer, and thus would have required a double renaming) being floated before Zealandia was eventually decided upon and subsequently approved by the King.

=== Construction ===
Wright has identified that the Controller of the Admiralty John Jellicoe had wanted to have Australia and New Zealand constructed by the same shipbuilder. This would have reduced construction costs and simplified administration. Tenders were issued early in 1910, but of those who were prepared to tender, all were only prepared to construct one vessel. Both Australia and New Zealand for unknown reasons agreed to accept that of John Brown & Company which was highest of the two successful tenders, but the former signalled its acceptance first, leaving New Zealand to accept that of Fairfield Shipbuilding and Engineering. The estimated cost of Fairfield's offer was £1.8 million, which included the guns and the first issue of ammunition. Fairfield had already built HMS Indomitable, which would have given them confidence in their cost estimate, which included all stores including first coal and ammunition. In the end John Brown & Company delivered Australia well under their original tendered price.

New Zealand's keel was laid at Fairfield's yard on the Clyde on 20 June 1910. The construction contract was between the Admiralty and Fairfield (using the Admiralty's standard contract terms) and was overseen by the Admiralty with manufacturer's payment claims being approved and then passed on by the Admiralty to the New Zealand High Commission's office in London. Variation claims were often individually itemised (such as £1. 12s. 6d. for a specific drawing) and passed on for payment, with some payments still being processed as late as the 1914–15 financial year. The ship was built with all stores supplied from the Admiralty at the "Rate Book" price plus 20 per cent, with exception of the coal. The Admiralty did not charge New Zealand for its management of the project. Fairfield's share of the contract made a profit of £50,454 (6 per cent).

The four main gun mountings were made by Armstrong Whitworth's Elswick Ordnance Works, at a cost of £207,593 (excluding delivery and assembly) while the guns were supplied by both Armstrong Whitworth and Vickers. The twenty-two 12-inch guns (including six spares) and thirty-six 4-inch guns (including four spares) required to equip both of the Dominion's ships cost a combined total of £249,550.

New Zealand was launched on 1 July 1911 in front of 8,000 onlookers by Lady Theresa Ward, the wife of Sir Joseph Ward, using a bottle of New Zealand wine for the christening. Following her launch New Zealand was moved by the Clyde Shipping Company's tugs Flying Linnet and Flying Swallow to the shipyard's fitting out basin, for installation of the boilers, engines, and auxiliary machinery though temporary openings in the main deck before the superstructure and armament was installed.

The battlecruiser's first captain, Lionel Halsey, took command on 21 September 1912. Sea trials began in October with the hull checked in dry dock on 8 October prior to a 30-hour steam test at three-quarter power being undertaken on the 9 and 10 October. Full power tests were conducted off Polperro on 14 October with 49,048 shp being generated. Over the "measured mile" she reached 25.49 knots (based on revolutions) and 26.3 knots (by bearings).

New Zealand was formally commissioned at Govan on 19 November 1912. The Admiralty required that all new ships be drydocked as part of the acceptance process to allow the completion and inspection of all underwater fittings. As Fairfield didn't have their own drydock, the ship sailed from Govan with the nucleus of her crew to Devonport to use that shipyard's facilities. By now the ship's hull had spent a considerable time in Fairfield's often polluted fitting out basin, so the hull was cleaned and then painted with a fresh anti-fouling coating.

The ship was officially completed on 23 November 1912, when she reached her nominally full complement of crew. Her officers by now included three New Zealanders, Lieutenant Alexander David Boyle, Lieutenant Rupert Clare Garsia and Midshipman Hugh Beckett Anderson, all from Christchurch.

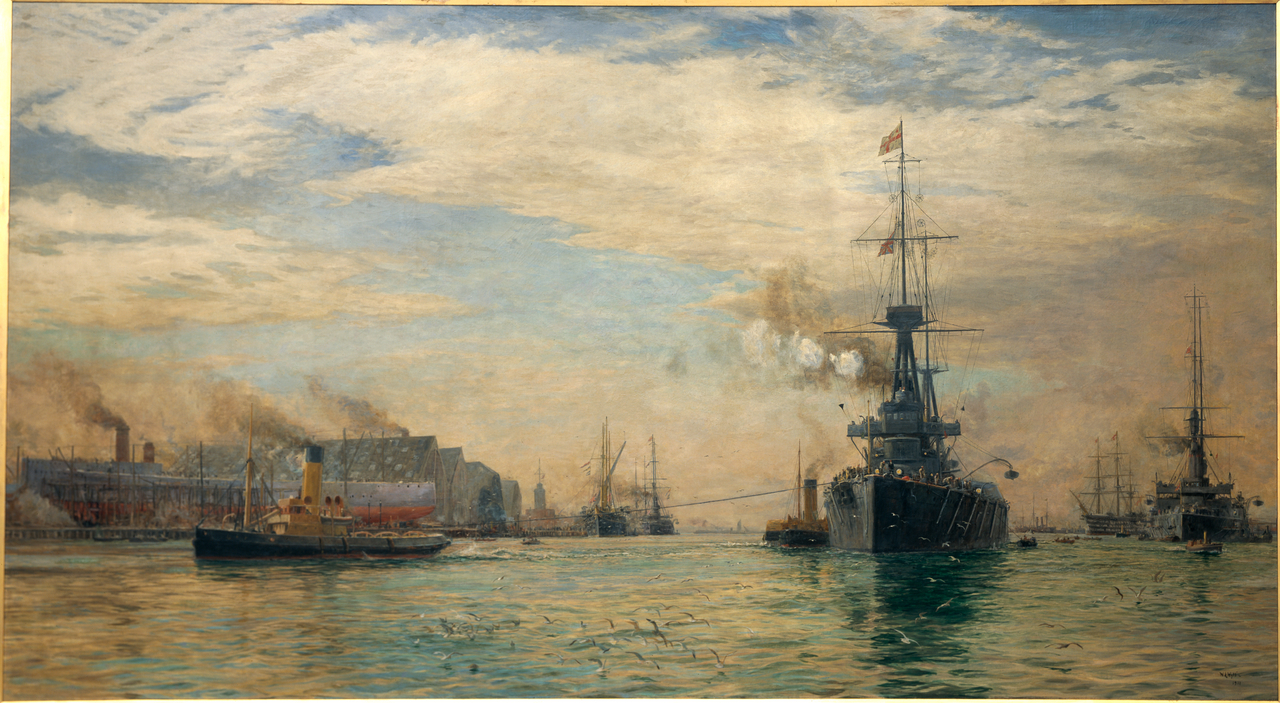
William Lionel Wylie, Tower House, Portsmouth [HMS "New Zealand" fitting out]

To signal her upcoming completion the New Zealand government commissioned the marine artist William Lionel Wyllie to produce a painting of New Zealand which he titled Tower House', Portsmouth [HMS "New Zealand" fitting out]. In subsequent years he also produced other paintings of the ship.

== Service history ==
In December 1912 the battlecruiser began the task of working up prior to joining the 1st Battlecruiser Squadron. While at sea over the 1912-13 New Year some of the masting was damaged by a storm.

=== 1913 circumnavigation of the world ===
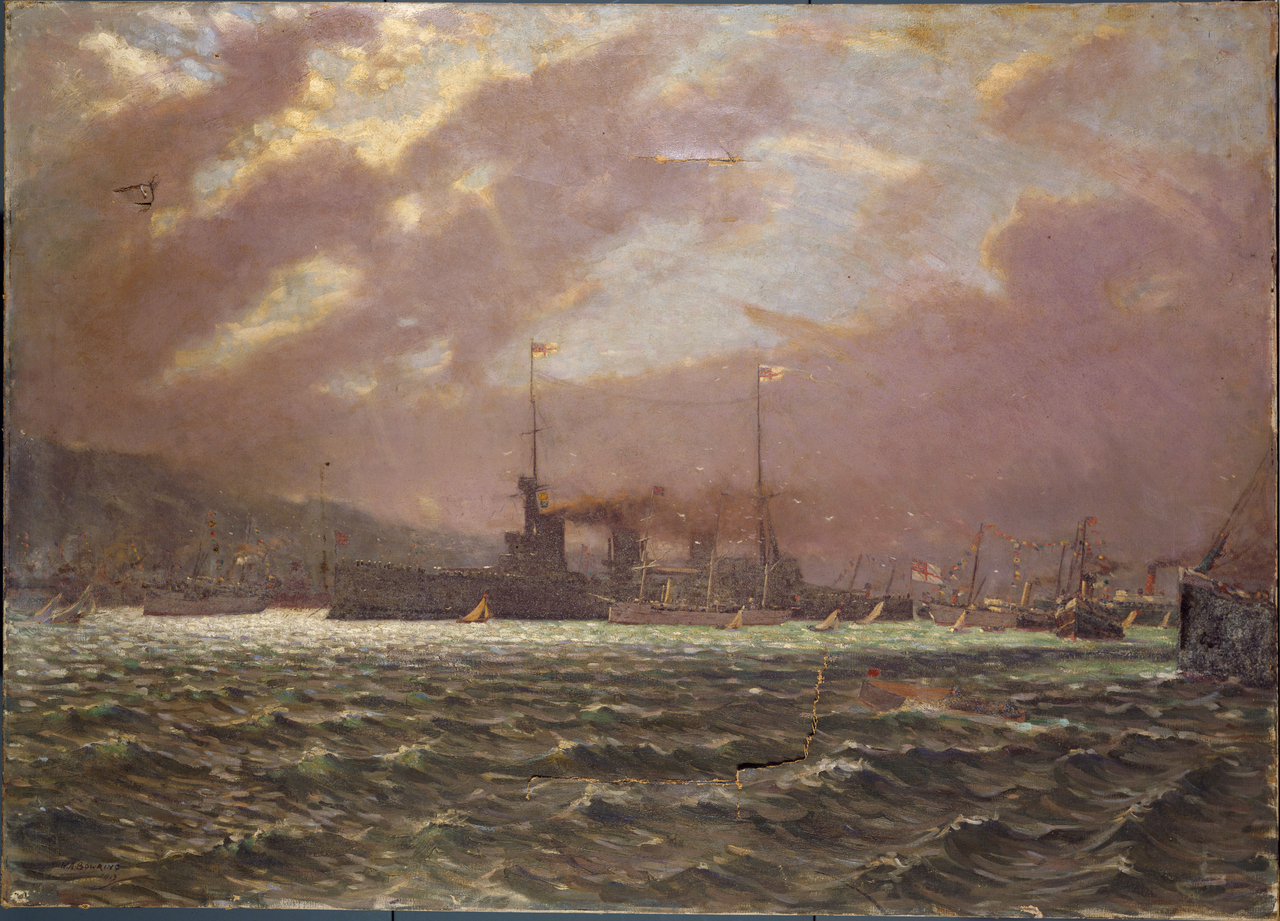
Painting by Walter Armiger Bowring showing the arrival of New Zealand in New Zealand in 1913

In 1912 it was agreed that the ship would visit its donor country as a 'thank you' for funding its construction, with a basic nine month long itinerary developed in the last months of 1912. To facilitate the flag-waving cruise New Zealand was temporary detached from the 1st Battlecruiser Squadron on 20 January 1913 for the duration of the voyage with Halsey having independent command. The initial date of departure progressively moved backward into 1913 with the ship finally departing the Royal Navy dockyard at Devonport on 28 January for Portsmouth which it reached two days later. On 3 February, 300 expatriate New Zealanders organized by Sir Thomas Mackenzie (New Zealand's High Commissioner to the United Kingdom) visited the ship at which he unveiled the battlecruiser's coat of arms (which had been gifted by the country's expatriate community in the United Kingdom). This was followed by a visit by King George V accompanied by Winston Churchill and James Allen (New Zealand's Minister of Finance and Defence) and other high–ranking officials on 5 February 1913. As soon as the King's party had departed, New Zealand took on coal before leaving Portsmouth on 6 February.

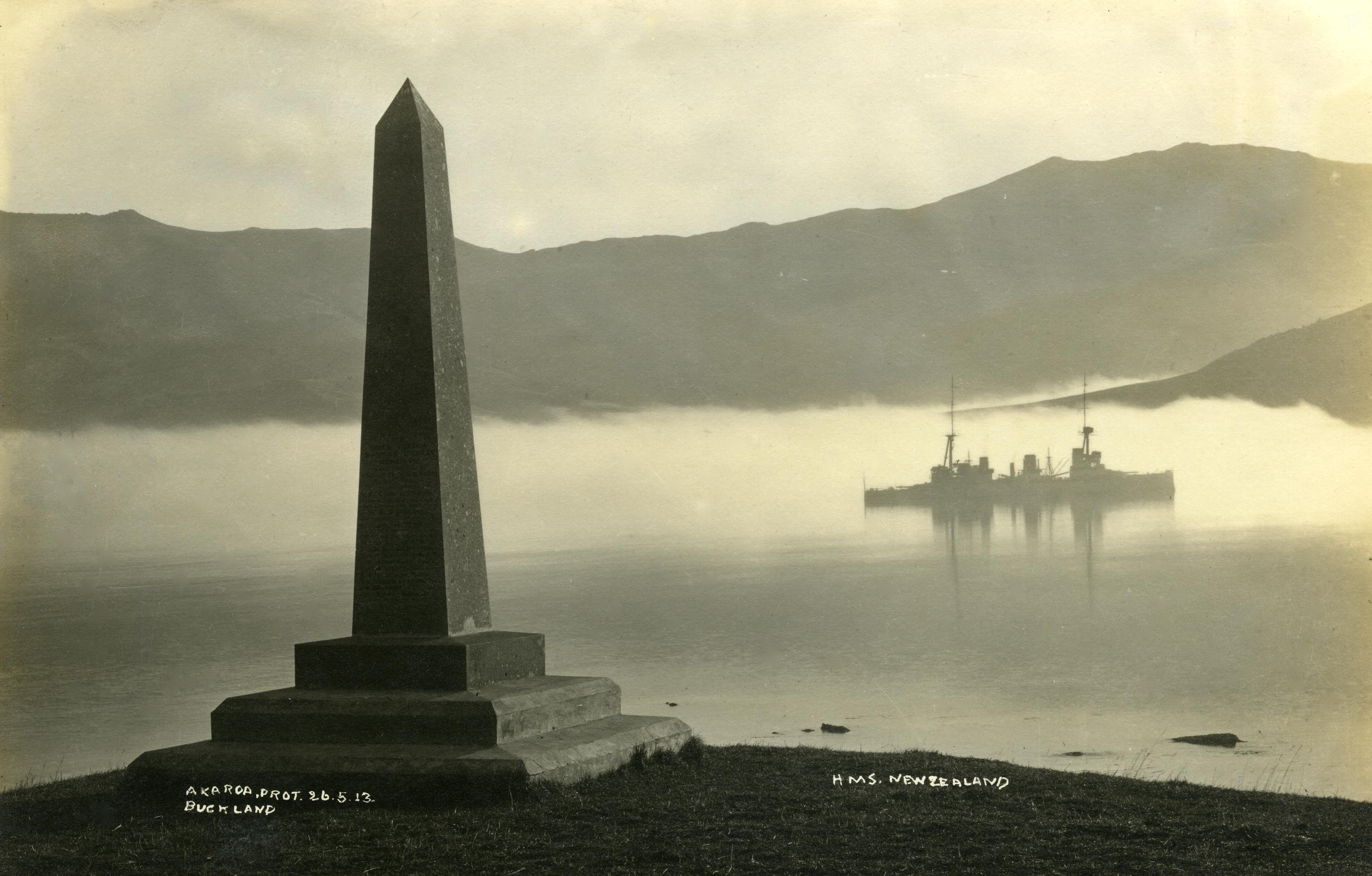
New Zealand in Akaroa Harbour with the Britomart Monument in the foreground

The battlecruiser received numerous gifts while in New Zealand, including a naval ensign and a union jack. Two greenstone hei-tiki (pendants), which were intended to ward off evil were gifted to the ship. One was given by the Boy Scouts of Wellington on 13 April, and the second by Christchurch businessman C. J. Sloman in May 1913. He had deposited the hei-tiki at Canterbury Museum in 1913 and then uplifted it a few months later to lend it to the ship on the condition that it had to be returned to Canterbury Museum should the name New Zealand ever be removed from the navy list.

The most notable gift was the personal gift to Halsey of a Māori piupiu (a warrior's skirt made from rolled flax). According to legend, the chief who gave the piupiu to Halsey instructed him to wear it during battle to protect the ship and its crew. If he did, then the ship would be involved in three sea battles; it would be hit only once; and no one on board would be killed. On many of these occasions speeches were often given in the Māori language, which may have resulted in a misunderstanding about the purpose of the gift. It is unclear exactly who presented the piupiu to Halsey, as he did not record details about who it was or about any prophesy. There are a number of possibilities as to who gifted the piupiu. One is that it was given by Rotorua Māori in Auckland on 26 June. Another is that it was given by Rangitīaria Dennan in Rotorua on 7 May. This account is supported by Halsey's daughter, which mentions meeting Dennan and a discussion with him about her father being gifted a piupiu when he made an honorary chief of the tribe. Another possibility was that the piupiu was given by the Te Arawa chief Mita Taupopoki. On 17 April a large group from Ngāti Raukawa visited the battlecruiser in Wellington at which it is recorded that "a presentation of piupiu (garments of war)" were made. Another likely candidate was that the piupiu was given to Halsey on behalf of Ngāi Tahu chief Mana Himiona Te Ataotu by Southern Māori MP, Taare Rakatauhake Parata (Charles Rere Parata) when he visited the ship in Wellington on 19 April 1913. On this occasion a piupiu was recorded as being given. A delegation of 25 leading Māori (including Māori members of parliament) did visit the battlecruiser in Wellington on 21 April among whom was Tureiti Te Heuheu Tukino V a leading chief of the Ngāti Tūwharetoa, But this occasion it was reported that "two kiwi robes, a tangiwai pendant, two korowai robes, and a kickio ("carpet mat") were gifted.

As a result of this visit the officers and crew of New Zealand were to maintain a close relationship with her donor country and its citizens over her years of service and her adventures were closely followed in the Dominion's newspapers. Though none of the crew were Māori they would occasionally perform the haka (in which they had received instruction while in New Zealand) at functions. The ship's Māori connection was also maintained by its official letterhead paper featuring the "Aotearoa", which was the Māori word for New Zealand.

By the time the battlecruiser departed New Zealand from Auckland on 28 June for Fiji, a total of 376,114 New Zealanders had visited the vessel during her time in the country, though other sources quote 376,086, 368,118. and 378,068. It is estimated that approximately another 125,000 had been able to see the ship either from the shore or from boats. At the time the country had a population of one million. The battlecruiser streamed across the Pacific via Suva, Fiji and Honolulu to dock on 23 July at the naval base of Esquimalt on Vancouver Island, Canada.

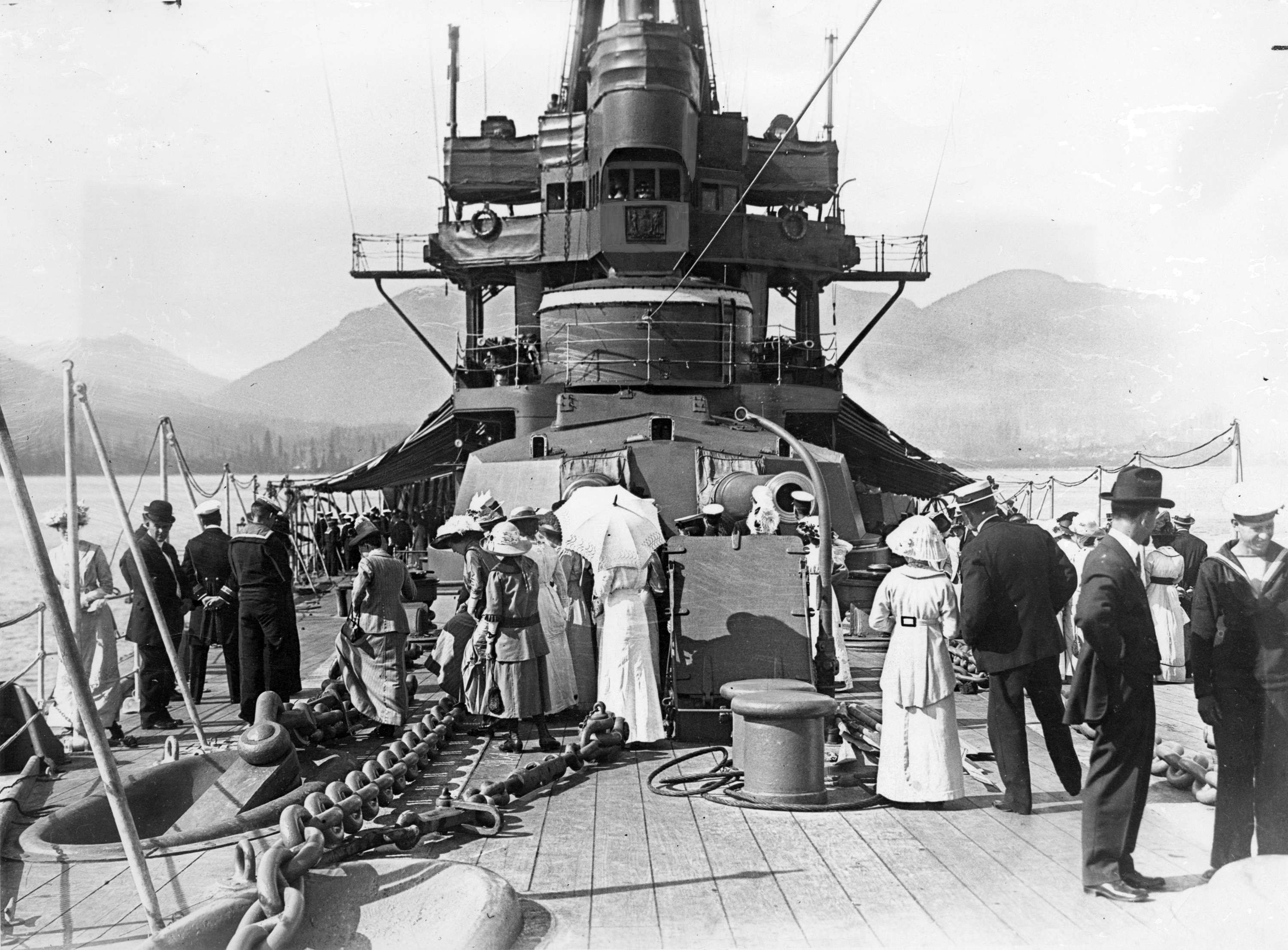
Civilians visit New Zealand at Vancouver in 1913

After departing Esquimalt New Zealand headed south stopping at Mazatlán, Acapulco, Panama City, Callao, Valparaíso, Punta Arenas, before she steamed through the Strait of Magellan and on to Montevideo, Rio Janeiro, then various islands of the Caribbean and finally Halifax, Nova Scotia (in Canada) before arriving in Portsmouth on 8 December 1913 having circumnavigated the globe. She had sailed 45,320 miles, consumed 31,833 tons of coal and had been visited by 500,151 people in what was the longest voyage to date by a vessel of the dreadnought era.

=== Assigned to the Grand fleet ===
The Admiralty requested that New Zealand return to the United Kingdom when the tour concluded, rather than remain in the Pacific region as originally planned. The New Zealand Government acceded to the request. As a result, upon her return to the United Kingdom, New Zealand joined the 1st Battlecruiser Squadron (1st BCS) of the Grand Fleet. The squadron visited Brest in February 1914, and Riga, Reval and Kronstadt in the Russian Empire the following June. While there they were visited by the Tsar and Tssarina on the 27 June and that evening hosted in a formal ball in conjunction with Lion, which was moored alongside. On the 29 June the squadron departed for the United Kingdom. The intention was that New Zealand would decommission on 30 August prior to transferring to the Mediterranean fleet where she would become the flagship of Rear Admiral Archibald Moore, but the outbreak of war cancelled that deployment.

=== First World War ===
On 19 August 1914, shortly after the First World War began, New Zealand was transferred to the 2nd Battlecruiser Squadron (2nd BCS).

==== Battle of Heligoland Bight ====
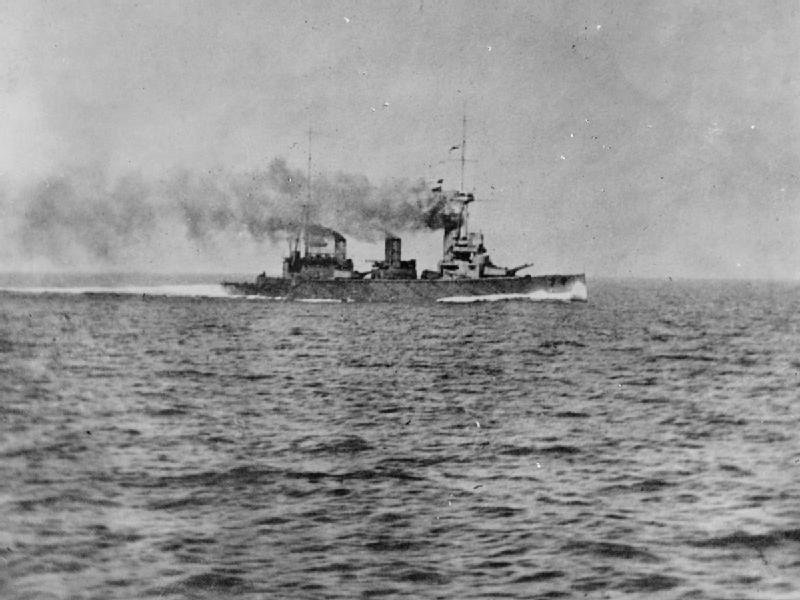
New Zealand steaming during the Battle of Heligoland Bight

New Zealand's first wartime action was the Battle of Heligoland Bight on 28 August 1914, as part of the battlecruiser force under the command of Admiral David Beatty. Beatty's ships were originally intended to provide distant support for the British cruisers and destroyers closer to the German coast, in case large units of the High Seas Fleet sortied in response to the British attacks once the tide rose. When the British light forces failed to disengage on schedule at 11:35, (Note: The times used in this section are in UT, which is one hour behind CET, which is often used in German works.) the battlecruisers, led by Beatty aboard his flagship, Lion, began to head south at full speed to reinforce the smaller British ships; the rising tide meant that German capital ships would be able to clear the sandbar at the mouth of the Jade estuary.

The brand-new light cruiser Arethusa had been crippled earlier in the battle and was under fire from the German light cruisers SMS Strassburg and SMS Cöln when Beatty's battlecruisers loomed out of the mist at 12:37. By this time, New Zealand had fallen behind the three newer and faster battlecruisers and was not in position to significantly participate in the battle. Strassburg was able to evade fire by hiding in the mists, but Cöln remained visible and was quickly crippled by the British squadron. Before the German ship could be sunk, Beatty was distracted by the sudden appearance of the elderly light cruiser SMS Ariadne off his starboard bow. He turned to pursue, but Ariadne was set afire after only three salvos fired from under 6,000 yards (5,500 m). At 13:10, Beatty turned north and made a general signal to retire. Shortly after turning north, the battlecruisers encountered the crippled Cöln, which was sunk by two salvos from Lion. During the battle, New Zealand's captain, Lionel Halsey, wore the Māori piupiu over his uniform, setting a tradition followed for the duration of the war. Two days after the battle, New Zealand was transferred back to the 1st BCS, when the battlecruiser Inflexible arrived from the Mediterranean.

==== Raid on Scarborough ====
The German Navy had decided on a strategy of bombarding British towns on the North Sea coast in an attempt to draw out the Royal Navy and destroy elements of it in detail. An earlier raid on Yarmouth on 3 November 1914 had been partially successful, but a larger-scale operation was later devised by Admiral Franz von Hipper. The fast battlecruisers would conduct the bombardment, while the rest of the High Seas Fleet stationed itself east of Dogger Bank, so they could cover the battlecruisers' return and destroy any pursuing British vessels. Having broken the German naval codes, the British were planning to catch the raiding force on its return journey, although they were not aware of the High Seas Fleet's presence. Admiral Beatty's 1st BCS (now reduced to four ships, including New Zealand) and the 2nd Battle Squadron (consisting of six dreadnoughts) were detached from the Grand Fleet in an attempt to intercept the Germans near Dogger Bank.

Admiral Hipper's raiders set sail on 15 December 1914, and successfully bombarded several English towns; British destroyers escorting the 1st BCS had already encountered German destroyers of the High Seas Fleet at 05:15 and fought an inconclusive action with them. Vice Admiral Sir George Warrender, commanding the 2nd Battle Squadron, had received a signal at 05:40 that the destroyer Lynx was engaging enemy destroyers, although Beatty had not. The destroyer Shark spotted the German armoured cruiser SMS Roon and her escorts at about 07:00, but could not transmit the message until 07:25. Admiral Warrender received the signal, as did New Zealand, but Beatty, aboard Lion, did not, even though New Zealand had been specifically tasked to relay messages between the destroyers and the flagship. Warrender attempted to pass on Shark's message to Beatty at 07:36, but did not manage to make contact until 07:55. On receiving the message, Beatty reversed course, and dispatched New Zealand to search for Roon. She was being overhauled by New Zealand when Beatty received messages that Scarborough was being shelled at 09:00. Beatty ordered New Zealand to rejoin the squadron and turned west for Scarborough.

Relative positions of the British and German forces at about 12:00 hours

The British forces, heading west to cover the main route through the minefields protecting the coast of England, split up while passing the shallow Southwest Patch of Dogger Bank; Beatty's ships headed to the north, while Warrender passed to the south. This left a 15-nautical-mile (28 km; 17 mi) gap between them, through which the German light forces began to move. At 12:25, the light cruisers of the II Scouting Group began to pass the British forces searching for Hipper. The light cruiser Southampton spotted the light cruiser SMS Stralsund and signalled a report to Beatty. At 12:30, Beatty turned his battlecruisers toward the German ships, which he presumed were the advance screen for Hipper's ships. However, those were some 50 kilometres (31 mi) behind. The 2nd Light Cruiser Squadron, which had been screening for Beatty's ships, detached to pursue the German cruisers, but a misinterpreted signal from the British battlecruisers sent them back to their screening positions. (Note: Beatty had intended on retaining only the two rearmost light cruisers from Goodenough's squadron; however, Nottingham's signalman misinterpreted the signal, thinking that it was intended for the whole squadron, and thus transmitted it to Goodenough, who ordered his ships back into their screening positions ahead of Beatty's battlecruisers.) This confusion allowed the German light cruisers to escape, and alerted Hipper to the location of the British battlecruisers. The German battlecruisers wheeled to the north-east of the British forces and also made good their escape.

==== Battle of Dogger Bank ====
New Zealand became flagship of the 2nd BCS of the Grand Fleet on 15 January 1915. Eight days later, a force of German battlecruisers under the command of Admiral Hipper sortied to clear Dogger Bank of any British fishing boats or small craft that might be there to collect intelligence on German movements. Alerted by decoded German transmissions, a larger force of British battlecruisers, including New Zealand, sailed under the command of Admiral Beatty to intercept. Contact was initiated at 07:20. on the 24th, when Arethusa spotted the German light cruiser SMS Kolberg. By 07:35, the Germans had spotted Beatty's force and Hipper ordered a turn south at 20 knots (37 km/h; 23 mph), believing that this speed would outdistance any British battleships to the north-west; he planned to increase speed to the armoured cruiser SMS Blücher's maximum of 23 knots (43 km/h; 26 mph) if necessary to outrun any battlecruisers.

Beatty ordered his battlecruisers to make all practical speed to catch the Germans before they could escape. New Zealand and Indomitable were the slowest of Beatty's ships, and gradually fell behind the newer battlecruisers, despite New Zealand achieving an indicated speed of 27 knots due to the original overdesign of the engines and to the efforts of her stokers. Despite dropping behind, New Zealand was able to open fire on Blücher by 09:35, and continued to engage the armoured cruiser after the other British battlecruisers had switched targets to the German battlecruisers. After about an hour, New Zealand had knocked out Blücher's forward turret, and Indomitable began to fire on her as well at 10:31. Two 12-inch shells pierced the German ship's armoured deck and exploded in an ammunition room four minutes later. This started a fire amidships that destroyed her two port 21 cm (8.3 in) turrets, while the concussion damaged her engines so that her speed dropped to 17 knots (31 km/h; 20 mph), and jammed her steering gear. At 10:48, Beatty ordered Indomitable to attack her, but the combination of a signalling error by Beatty's flag lieutenant and heavy damage to Beatty's flagship Lion, which had knocked out her radio and caused enough smoke to obscure her signal halyards, caused the rest of the British battlecruisers, temporarily under the command of Rear Admiral Sir Gordon Moore in New Zealand, to think that that signal applied to them. In response, they turned away from Hipper's main body and engaged Blücher. New Zealand fired 147 shells at Blücher before the German ship capsized and sank at 12:07 after being torpedoed by Arethusa. Other sources dispute the number of shells fired by New Zealand with Wright stating 151 shells (12 shells of common 12-inch and 139 shells of 12-inch high explosive) during the action. Halsey had again worn the piupiu over his uniform during the battle, and the lack of damage to New Zealand was once more attributed to its good luck properties.

New Zealand was relieved by Australia as flagship of the 2nd BCS on 22 February. The squadron joined the Grand Fleet in a sortie on 29 March, in response to intelligence that the German fleet was leaving port as the precursor to a major operation. By the next night, the German ships had withdrawn, and the squadron returned to Rosyth. On 11 April, the British fleet was again deployed on the intelligence that a German force was planning an operation. The Germans intended to lay mines at the Swarte Bank, but after a scouting Zeppelin located a British light cruiser squadron, they began to prepare for what they thought was a British attack. Heavy fog and the need to refuel caused Australia and the British vessels to return to port on 17 April, and although they were redeployed that night, they were unable to stop two German light cruisers from laying the minefield. In June Halsey was promoted to Captain of the fleet with rank of Commodore on HMS Iron Duke and was succeeded as captain of New Zealand by J.F.E. (Jimmy) Green. Despite it being his personal property Halsey left the piupiu in the care of Green.

==== Collision with HMAS Australia ====
On the morning of 21 April, the 2nd BCS left Rosyth at 04:00 (accompanied by the 4th Light Cruiser Squadron and destroyers) again bound for the Skagerrak, this time to support efforts to disrupt the transport of Swedish ore to Germany. The planned destroyer sweep of the Kattegat was cancelled when word came that the High Seas Fleet was mobilising for an operation of their own (later learned to be timed to coincide with the Irish Easter Rising), and the British ships were ordered to a rendezvous point in the middle of the North Sea, with the 1st and 3rd Battlecruiser Squadrons while the rest of the Grand Fleet made for the south-eastern end of the Long Forties. At 15:30 on the afternoon of 22 April, the three squadrons of battlecruisers were patrolling together to the north-west of Horn Reefs when heavy fog came down, while the ships were steaming abreast at 19.5 knots, with Australia on the port flank. Concerned about possible submarine attack Beatty issued instructions at 15:35 for the fleet to commence zigzagging. It took some time for the instruction to be relayed by signal flag down the line and so it wasn't until 15:40 that Australia with a cruiser to her port side commenced her first zigzag and swung to starboard. The crew were aware that New Zealand was on that side about five cables (926 metres) away but the poor visibility meant that as they made their turn they didn't see her until it was too late and they hit at 15:43, despite Australia attempting to turn away to port. Australia's side was torn open from frames 59 to 78 by the armour plate on the hull below her sister ships P-turret, while as New Zealand turned away her outer port propeller damaged Australia's hull below her Q-turret.

Australia slowed to half-speed as the mist hid her sister ship, but the damage to New Zealand's propeller caused a temporary loss of control and she swung back in front of Australia which despite turning to port, had her stem crushed at 15:46 as she scraped the side of New Zealand, just behind her P-turret. Both ships to come to a complete stop about 30–40 yd (27–37 m) apart while their respective officers assessed the damage. The damage control teams on the Australia were soon busy storing up bulkheads and sealing off the damage portions to prevent any more water entering the ship. Meanwhile off watch Australian sailors took advantage of a convenient potato locker to hurl both its contents and insults at the crew of their nearby sister ship. New Zealand was soon underway, returning to Rosyth with the rest of the squadron. The same fog caused the battleship Neptune to collide with a merchant ship and the destroyers Ambuscade, Ardent and Garland to collide with one another.

Once it was safe to proceed Australia with her speed restricted to 12, and then later to 16 knots arrived back at Rosyth to find both drydocks occupied, one by New Zealand and the other by HMS Dreadnought so she departed for Newcastle-on-Tyne, where she was further damaged trying to dock during strong winds. As this facility couldn't handle all of the repairs that it needed the battlecruiser was ordered to Devonport. Australia was not able to return to sea until 31 May, thus missing the Battle of Jutland. Meanwhile New Zealand replaced her damaged propeller with Australia's spare propeller which was in store at Rosyth and returned to the fleet on 30 May, a day before the start of the Battle of Jutland. Due to the continued absence of Australia Rear Admiral William Christopher Pakenham transferred his flag from Indefatigable to New Zealand.

==== Battle of Jutland ====
Assembled officers of New Zealand together with Winston Churchill and King George V

On 31 May 1916, the 2nd BCS consisted of its flagship New Zealand and Indefatigable; Australia was still under repair following her collision with New Zealand. The squadron was assigned to Admiral Beatty's Battlecruiser Fleet, which had put to sea to intercept a sortie by the High Seas Fleet into the North Sea. The British were able to decode the German radio messages and left their bases before the Germans put to sea. Hipper's battlecruisers spotted the Battlecruiser Fleet to their west at 15:20, but Beatty's ships did not spot the Germans to their east until 15:30. Two minutes later, he ordered a course change to east-south-east to position himself astride the German's line of retreat and called his ships' crews to action stations. He also ordered the 2nd BCS, which had been leading, to fall in astern of the 1st BCS. Hipper ordered his ships to turn to starboard, away from the British, to assume a south-easterly course, and reduced speed to 18 knots (33 km/h; 21 mph) to allow three light cruisers of the 2nd Scouting Group to catch up. With this turn, Hipper was falling back on the High Seas Fleet, then about 60 miles (97 km) behind him. Around this time, Beatty altered course to the east as it was quickly apparent that he was still too far north to cut off Hipper.

Thus began the so-called "Run to the South" as Beatty changed course to steer east-south-east at 15:45, paralleling Hipper's course, now that the range closed to under 18,000 yards (16,000 m). The Germans opened fire first at 15:48, followed by the British. The British ships were still in the process of making their turn, and only the two leading ships, Lion and Princess Royal, had steadied on their course when the Germans opened fire. The British formation was echeloned to the right with Indefatigable in the rear and the furthest to the west, and New Zealand ahead of her and slightly further east. The German fire was accurate from the beginning, but the British overestimated the range as the German ships blended into the haze. Indefatigable aimed at Von der Tann, while New Zealand, disengaged herself, targeted SMS Moltke. By 15:54, the range was down to 12,900 yards (11,800 m) and Beatty ordered a course change two points to starboard to open up the range at 15:57. Indefatigable was destroyed at about 16:03, when her magazines exploded.

After Indefatigable's loss, New Zealand shifted her fire to Von der Tann in accordance with Beatty's standing instructions. The range had grown too far for accurate shooting, so Beatty altered course four points to port to close the range again between 16:12 and 16:15. By this time, the 5th Battle Squadron, consisting of four Queen Elizabeth-class battleships, had closed up and was engaging Von der Tann and Moltke. At 16:23, a 13.5-inch (340 mm) shell from Tiger struck near Von der Tann's rear turret, starting a fire among the practice targets stowed there that completely obscured the ship and caused New Zealand to shift fire to Moltke. At 16:26, the ship was hit by a 28-centimetre (11 in) shell, fired by Von der Tann, on 'X' barbette that detonated on contact and knocked loose a piece of armour that briefly jammed 'X' turret and blew a hole in the upper deck. Four minutes later, Southampton, scouting in front of Beatty's ships, spotted the lead elements of the High Seas Fleet charging north at top speed. Three minutes later, she sighted the topmasts of Vice-Admiral Reinhard Scheer's battleships, but did not transmit a message to Beatty for another five minutes. Beatty continued south for another two minutes to confirm the sighting himself before ordering a sixteen-point turn to starboard in succession. New Zealand, the last ship in the line, turned prematurely to stay outside the range of the oncoming battleships.

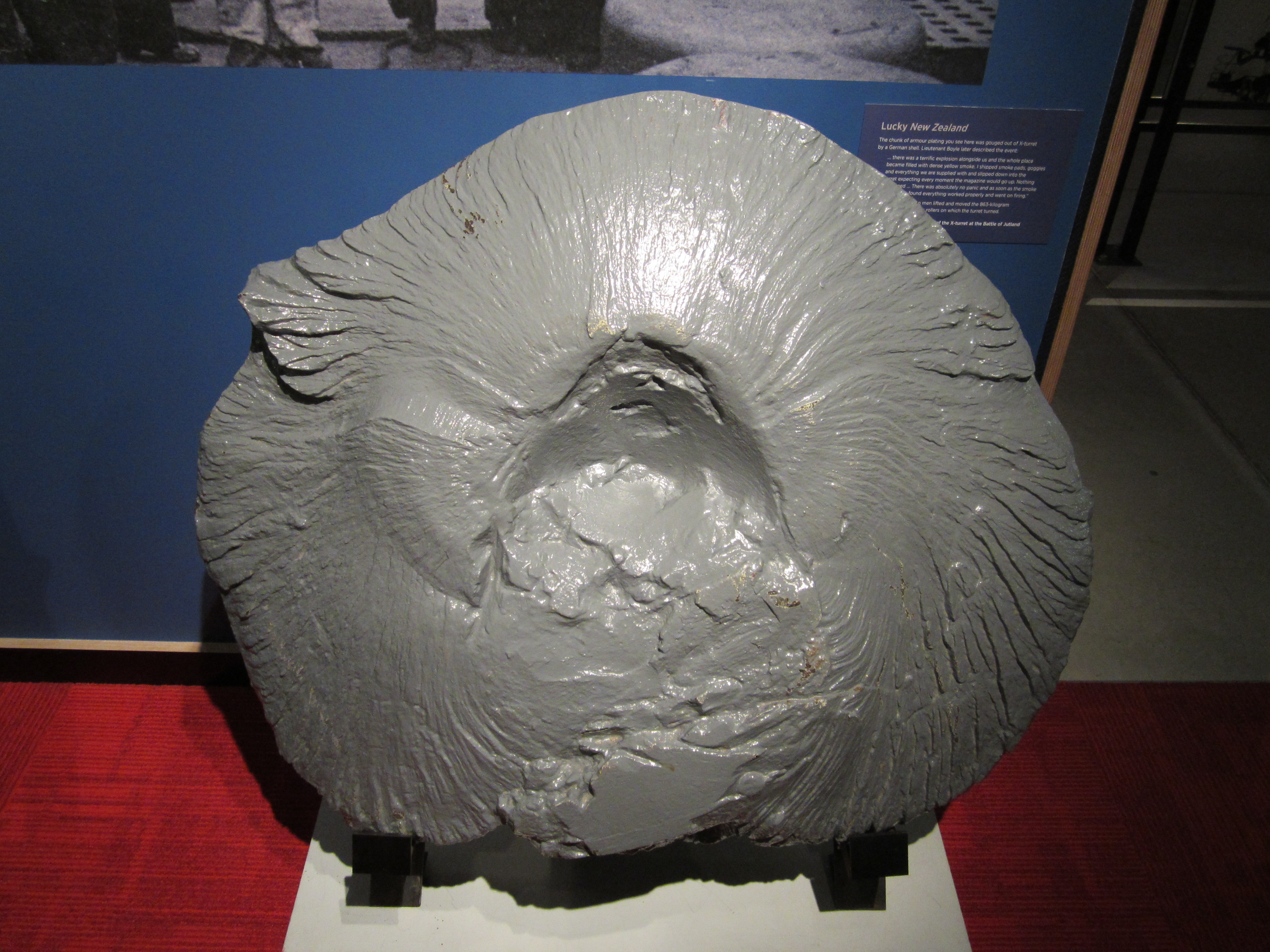
A chunk of armour knocked from New Zealand's 'X' turret during the Battle of Jutland on display at the Torpedo Bay Navy Museum in Auckland

New Zealand was straddled several times by the battleship SMS Prinzregent Luitpold but was not hit. Beatty's ships maintained full speed in an attempt to increase the distance between them and the High Seas Fleet, and gradually moved out of range. They turned north and then north-east to try to rendezvous with the main body of the Grand Fleet. At 17:40, they opened fire again on the German battlecruisers. The setting sun blinded the German gunners, and as they could not make out the British ships, they turned away to the north-east at 5:47. Beatty gradually turned more towards the east to allow him to cover the deployment of the Grand Fleet in battle formation and to move ahead of it, but he mistimed his manoeuvre and forced the leading division to fall off towards the east, further away from the Germans. By 18:35, Beatty was following Indomitable and Inflexible of the 3rd BCS as they were steering east-south-east, leading the Grand Fleet, and continuing to engage Hipper's battlecruisers to their south-west. A few minutes earlier, Scheer had ordered a simultaneous 180° starboard turn and Beatty lost sight of the High Seas Fleet in the haze. Twenty minutes later, Scheer ordered another 180° turn which put them on a converging course again with the British, which had altered course to the south. This allowed the Grand Fleet to cross Scheer's T, forming a battle line that cut across his battle line and badly damaging his leading ships. Scheer ordered yet another 180° turn at 19:13 in an attempt to extricate the High Seas Fleet from the trap into which he had sent them.

This was successful, and the British lost sight of the Germans until 20:05, when Castor spotted smoke bearing west-north-west. Ten minutes later, she had closed the range enough to identify German torpedo boats, and engaged them. Beatty turned west upon hearing gunfire and spotted the German battlecruisers only 8,500 yards (7,800 m) away. Inflexible opened fire at 20:20, followed by the rest of Beatty's battlecruisers. New Zealand and Indomitable concentrated their fire on SMS Seydlitz, and hit her five times before she turned west to disengage. Shortly after 20:30, the pre-dreadnought battleships of Rear Admiral Mauve's II Battle Squadron were spotted and fire switched to them. The Germans had poor visibility and were able to fire only a few rounds at them before turning away to the west. The British battlecruisers hit the German ships several times before they blended into the haze around 20:40. After this, Beatty changed course to south-south-east and maintained that course, ahead of both the Grand Fleet and the High Seas Fleet, until 02:55 the next morning, when the order was given to reverse course and head home.

New Zealand arrived back in Rosyth on 2 June and dropped anchor at 09:55. The crew had approximately 50 minutes rest before, with the potential possibly that she may have to put to sea again, they began the task of refuelling with 1,178 tons of coal and then replenishing the ammunition with 480 twelve-inch shells, work which continued until 03:30 on the following morning.

New Zealand fired 430 twelve-inch shells during the battle, 100 from A-turret, 129 from P-turret, 105 from Q-turret and 96 from X-turret, more than any other ship on either side. Despite this rate of fire, only four successful hits were credited to her: three on Seydlitz and one on the pre-dreadnought SMS Schleswig-Holstein. This gave a hit rate of less than one per cent. Other than the single hit on X-turret the only other damage was from near misses and was minimal, consisting of a shell through the silk jack, a splinter hitting the ensign staff, the No.3 cutter had some damage to its bow and the No.2 picket boat was hit in three places. This confirmed to the crew that the piupiu and hei-tiki worn by Captain Green, brought good luck.

==== Post-Jutland career ====
The ship's company were firm believers both in the old chief's prophecy and in the ability of the piu piu and tiki to ward off trouble. More than a year after the Battle of Jutland, on the last occasion that New Zealand sighted enemy ships and went to action stations, a seaman was seen to climb a ladder to the bridge and take a quick look around. "It's all right," he called to his mates below, "he's got them on"—a shout that assured them that the captain was wearing the piu piu and tiki.

— Grant Howard, The Navy in New Zealand

New Zealand was relieved by Australia as flagship on 9 June and temporarily attached to the 1st Battlecruiser Squadron, until HMS Renown relieved her in September. On the evening of 18 August, the Grand Fleet put to sea in response to a message deciphered by Room 40 that indicated that the High Seas Fleet, minus II Squadron, would be leaving harbour that night. The German objective was to bombard Sunderland on 19 August, based on extensive reconnaissance provided by airships and submarines. The Grand Fleet sailed with 29 dreadnought battleships and six battlecruisers. Throughout the next day, Jellicoe and Scheer received conflicting intelligence; after reaching the location in the North Sea where the British expected to encounter the High Seas Fleet, they turned north in the erroneous belief that they had entered a minefield. Scheer turned south again, then steered south-eastward to pursue a lone British battle squadron sighted by an airship, which was in fact the Harwich Force of cruisers and destroyers under Commodore Tyrwhitt. Realising their mistake, the Germans changed course for home. The only contact came in the evening when Tyrwhitt sighted the High Seas Fleet but was unable to achieve an advantageous attack position before dark, and broke off contact. The British and the German fleets returned home; the British lost two cruisers to submarine attacks, and one German dreadnought had been torpedoed. New Zealand underwent a refit at Rosyth in November 1916. She temporarily replaced Australia as squadron flagship between 29 November and 7 January 1917.

On 1 October 1917 Green gave up his command of the ship following a promotion to Rear-Admiral, but it wasn't until 13 December 1917 that Captain Edward Kennedy assumed temporary command, which he held until 17 January 1918 when Richard Webb took over the permanent captain. Webb remained captain until September when he was made a rear-admiral and left to take up the role of Assistant High Commissioner at Constantinople. In the latter stages of the war a number of New Zealand soldiers on leave were able to take advantage of the open invitation extended to them by New Zealand's captain to visit the ship.

German minesweepers and escorting light cruisers were attempting to clear British-laid minefields in the Heligoland Bight in late 1917. The Admiralty planned a large operation for 17 November to destroy the ships, and allocated two light cruiser squadrons and the 1st Cruiser Squadron covered by the reinforced 1st Battlecruiser Squadron and, more distantly, the 1st Battle Squadron of battleships. New Zealand was attached to the 1st BCS for this operation, which became known as the Second Battle of Heligoland Bight. New Zealand did not fire her guns during the battle. As in previous engagements, Captain Green wore the piupiu and tiki for luck.

During 1918, New Zealand and the Grand Fleet's other capital ships were used on occasion to escort convoys between the United Kingdom and Norway. The 2nd BCS spent the period from 8 to 21 February covering these convoys in company with battleships and destroyers, and put to sea on 6 March in company with the 1st BCS to support minelayers. The 2nd BCS again supported minelayers in the North Sea from 25 June or 26 June to the end of July. During September and October, New Zealand and the 2nd BCS supervised and protected minelaying operations north of Orkney. In the former month Leonard Andrew Boyd Donaldson took over command of the ship and remained in command until 11 February 1919.

By the time of the 1918 armistice New Zealand had since August 1914 sailed 84,458 nautical miles, consumed 97,034 tons of coal and fired a total of 664 twelve-inch shells in action. As a member of the 2nd BCS the battlecruiser was present at the surrender of the High Seas Fleet in November 1918. To witness the event New Zealand embarked five soldiers from the New Zealand Division and a New Zealand newspaper reporter. New Zealand was assigned responsibility for checking the compliance of SMS Derfflinger with the terms of its internment.

=== Post-war ===
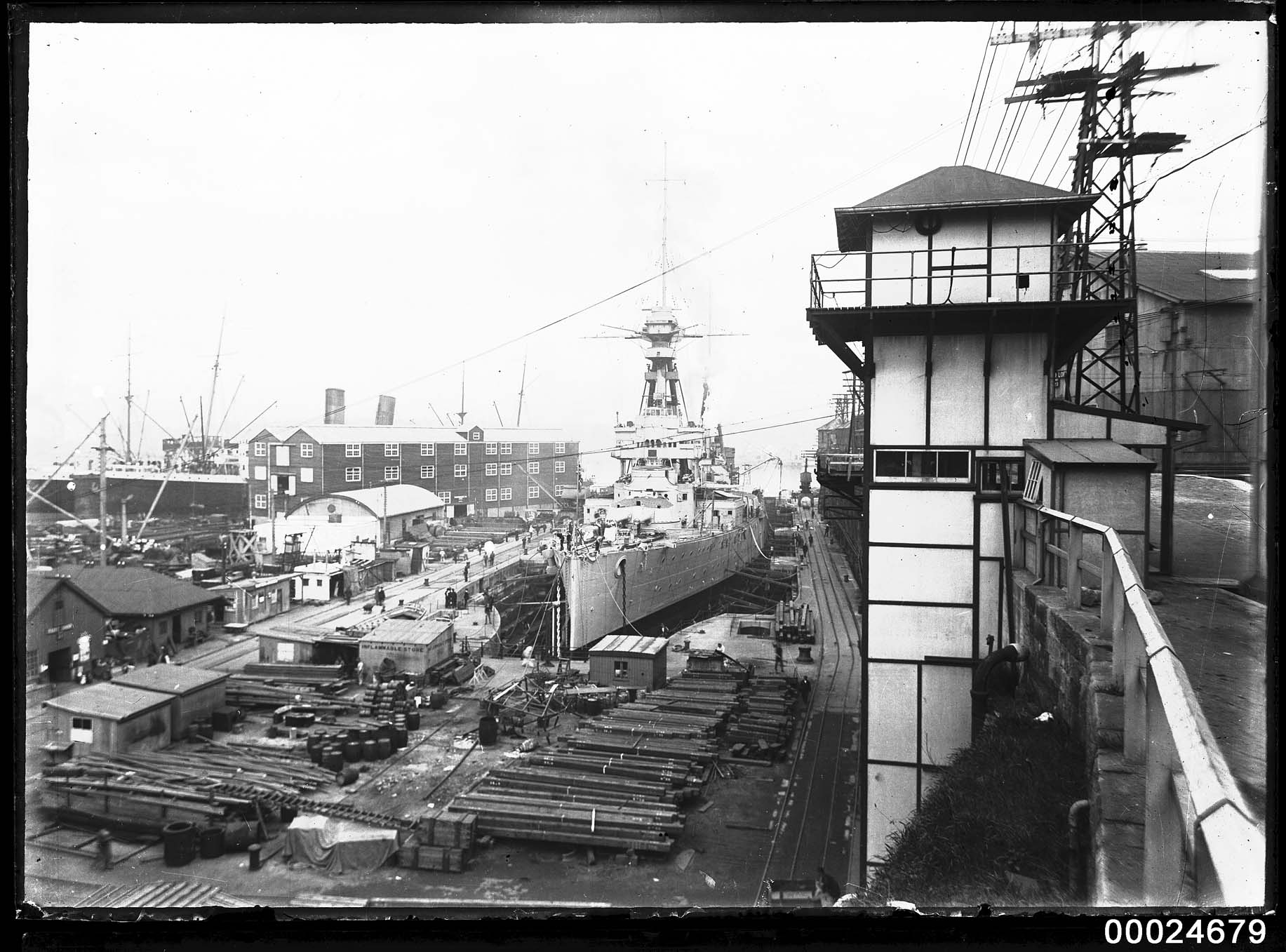
New Zealand dry-docked at Cockatoo Island Dockyard in Sydney during Admiral Jellicoe's tour of the Dominions

In December 1918 New Zealand was used to convey Queen Maud and Prince Olav from Norway for their state visit of the United Kingdom. With the war at an end most of the United Kingdom's older capital ships were put into reserve, as they were by now obsolete and with the government wishing to make significant cuts in its military expenditure there was little chance of their returning to full service, especially once the formal peace treaty was signed with Germany in mid-1919. One exception was New Zealand, which it was decided would be used to transport Admiral Jellicoe on what was to be an expected year-long visit to India and the dominions of Australia, Canada, and New Zealand to assist with planning and coordinating their naval policies and defences. To prepare her for voyage, the battlecruiser was refitted between December 1918 and 11 February 1919 at the end of which she was recommissioned with a virtually all-new crew under the command of Captain Oliver Leggett.

The battlecruiser departed Portsmouth on 21 February 1919 and while crossing the Bay of Biscay encountered a storm that forced the evacuation of the newly constructed accommodation for Jellicoe and his staff when it became apparent that the dockyard had failed to seal the holes in the structure. After a 24-hour stop at Gibraltar for Jellicoe to make his first official visit the battlecruiser continued onto Port Said to take on approximately 2,000 tons of coal before continuing through the Suez Canal to make a brief stop at Suez where Jellicoe rejoined it (having left it at Port Said to visit Cairo) before crossing the Arabian Sea to reach Bombay on 14 March. While Jellicoe was engaged in a week of consultations in Delhi, 1,740 tons of coal was taken on board and the opportunity was taken for the battlecruiser to be painted in the dockyard. This was completed on 22 March, just in time for the ship to host a ball three days later. The battlecruiser then made a two-day visit to Karachi before returning to Bombay. Unfortunately while in Karachi a sailor was killed after falling off a balcony while on shore. Once back in Bombay some of the crew got into trouble while on shore leave, which was cancelled in response.

New Zealand departed Bombay on 1 May for Columbo, which was reached two days later, where 1,800 tons of coal and 700 tons of oil was taken on board, in preparation for the journey across the Indian Ocean. By the 9 May the battlecruiser was in the vicinity of the Cocos (Keeling) Islands and the opportunity was taken to divert so that the crew could see the remains of the light cruiser SMS Emden.

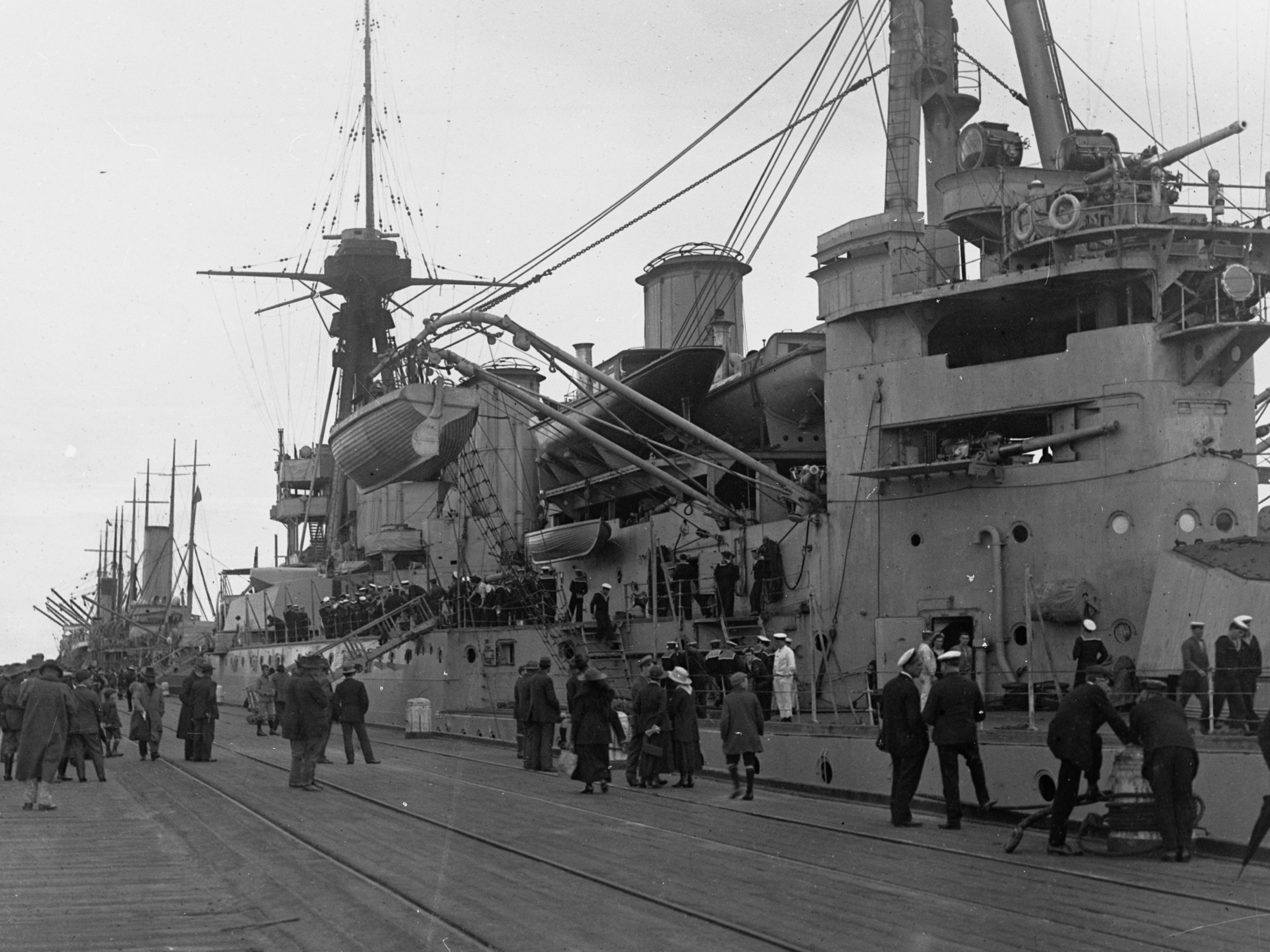
New Zealand berthed at Outer Harbor, South Australia

The ship arrived at Albany, Western Australia, on 15 May, where Jellicoe and his staff disembarked to take an overland route across the country. New Zealand sailed via Perth, Outer Harbor (near Adelaide), Melbourne and Hobart with the opportunity taken for New Zealand to exercise with Australia and other units of the RAN prior to reaching Sydney. Here she was drydocked in Sunderland Dock at Cockatoo Island where her bottom was scraped and painted, before being refloated and coaled. The battlecruiser left Sydney on 16 August for New Zealand.

Wellington was reached on 20 August, as the influenza pandemic was rampant. As a result, the crew was subjected to a medical inspection before anyone was allowed to disembark. While in Wellington the ship was visited by approximately 50,000 New Zealanders prior to 24 August before it proceeded south to Lyttelton, which was reached on 1 September. The ship then proceeded north to anchor off Picton on 13 September where it spent two days and then after a stop in Wellington it sailed up the east coast of the North Island to reach Auckland on 22 September. Jellicoe, during the next six weeks as he visited ports throughout the country, was preparing a three-volume report for the government. The ship was particularly popular in New Zealand, with Jellicoe, the officers and crew attending numerous social engagements. The tour around the country allowed Jellicoe and his staff to familiarize themselves with the country as they prepared recommendations for the New Zealand government on its naval policy. Crowds flocked to visit the battlecruiser as they had done in 1913. Jellicoe, too, was popular and he later returned to New Zealand to serve as Governor-General from 1920 to 1924.

The battlecruiser left Auckland on 3 October, briefing stopping at Suva in Fiji and Samoa with mail, where at the latter her 12-inch guns were fired to entertain the local chiefs, then Fanning Island for (six hours) and Hawaii. En route the ship called upon Christmas Island (Kiritimati), southeast of Fanning Island, on 20 October 1919, thinking it uninhabited. Instead, they were greeted by Joe English, of Medford, Massachusetts, who had been manager of a copra plantation on the island, but had become marooned with two others when the war broke out. The men were evacuated.

The battlecruiser arrived in Canada, the final country to be assessed when it docked on 8 November and docking at Esquimalt on Vancouver Island. The Jellicoes left the ship on 20 November to tour Canada and the United States by train before re-joining it in Key West. On 11 November two rugby teams from the ship competed against local teams from Victoria. The officers played the Wanderers and the crew played V.I.A.A (Vancouver Island Athletic Association).

After leaving Vancouver the ship stopped at San Diego, before passing via the Panama Canal into the Caribbean where as well as visiting Havana time was spent in Jamaica, where exercising of the main armament was undertaken. During a stop at Port of Spain on the island of Trinidad a petty officer fell off a wharf and was drowned. Heading north the battlecruiser picked Jellicoe at Key West on 8 January 1920. The battlecruiser reached Portsmouth on 3 February having covered 33,514 nautical miles. As Jellicoe had been promoted to Admiral of the Fleet while overseas the ship was greeted by the appropriate 19-gun salute from HMS Victory.

=== Put into reserve ===
On 6 February New Zealand was pulled by tugs to a mooring on the Hamoaze. Most of the crew sent on six-weeks leave, with a skeleton crew of 250 remaining behind under the command of Lieutenant Commander Alexander David Boyle. Leggett gave up command of New Zealand and was succeeded by Captain Hartley Russell Gwennap Moore (1881–1953) on 11 March. Moore remained in that position until July 1921.

New Zealand was paid off into reserve on 15 March 1920. By this time the battlecruiser was regarded as obsolete by the Royal Navy, as she was coal powered and her 12-inch guns were inferior to the 15-inch (381 mm) guns deployed on the latest generation of capital ships. She was briefly recommissioned on 1 July 1921 with a reserve crew to replace HMS Hercules as flagship at Rosyth under the command of Captain Ralph Eliot (1881–1958), who had previously been in command of Hercules. Eliot was to be the ship's last captain, and remained in command until 1 September.

=== Scrapping ===
Along with all of the other British 12-inch battleships and battlecruisers it was agreed that New Zealand would be scrapped to meet the tonnage restrictions set on the British Empire by the Washington Naval Treaty.

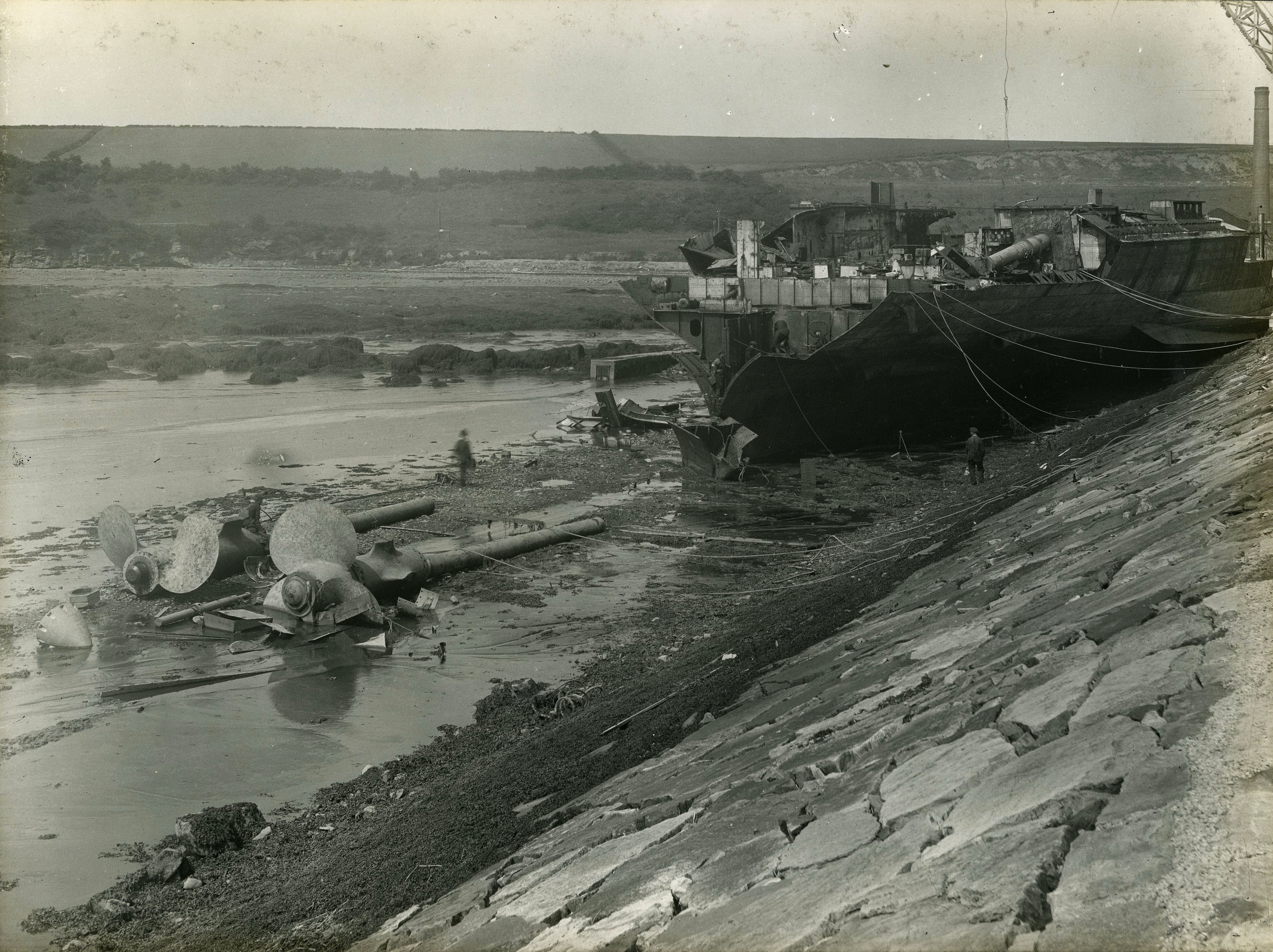
Partially scrapped remains of New Zealand at Rosyth, 1924

New Zealand was sold for scrap together with Agincourt and Princess Royal to the Exeter-based electrical engineering firm of J&W Purves with the proviso that they had to be demolished within 18 months of the Washington Naval Treaty being ratified. To meet the Admiralty's desire to provide work for unemployed dock workers at Rosyth Dockyard the contract was immediately transferred the contract to a new entity chaired by A. Wallace Cowan (1877–1964) called the Rosyth Shipbreaking Company which would undertake the scrapping of the vessels at Rosyth. It took until 19 December 1922 to legally organize the transfer of the ships from the Royal Navy to the new company, which had among its directors Admiral J.F.E. Green who had commanded the ship at the Battle of Jutland. Leased facilities were set up adjacent to where the vessels were lying alongside a wharf on the south side of the main basin in the Naval Dockyard at Rosyth. The vessels were taken over on 25 January 1923 with work commencing first on New Zealand. By March 1923 her superstructure had been removed and she was moved out of the basin and beached above the low tide mark on a beach outside of the wall of the northwest dockyard. A large portion of New Zealand's hull was still being dismantled in July 1924 and it wasn't until September 1924 that the last components of New Zealand were removed from the site. And her place on the beach was taken over by the Princess Royal. Between them the three vessels yielded 40,000 tons of steel, approximately 10,000 tons of armour plate and even 3,000 tons of coal still in their bunkers.

The New Zealand government received £20,000 from the sale of the vessel and completed paying off the loan used to fund the ship in the 1944/45 financial year.

== Artifacts ==
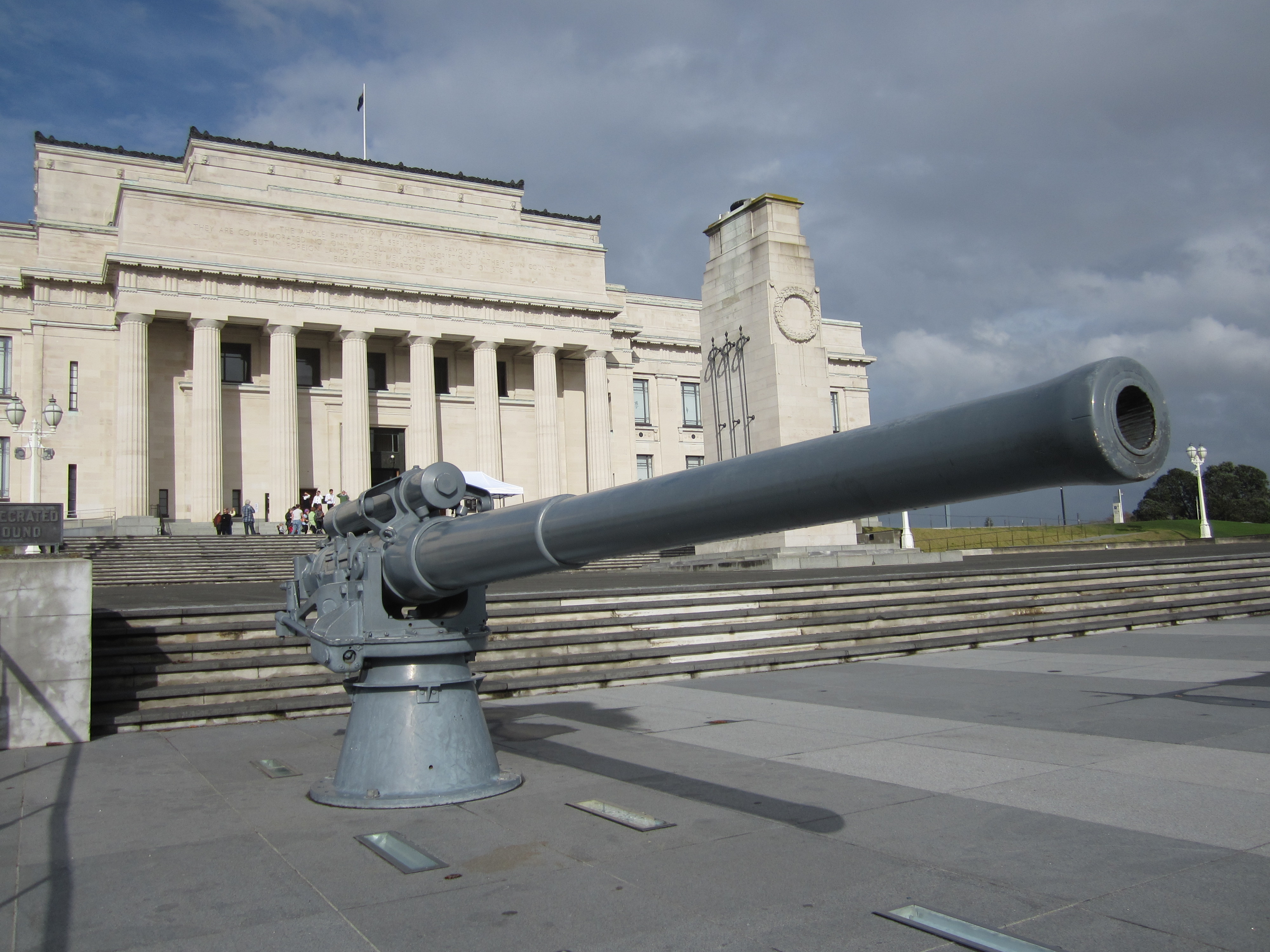
One of New Zealand's 4-inch guns, outside the Auckland Museum

By the time of the decision to scrap New Zealand had an impressive collection of silverware and trophies (officially listed at 47 in January 1919).

The 4-inch guns, a range finder and laundry equipment, were used by military units. During the Second World War, the 4-inch guns were the main armament of the land batteries which protected the entrances to the harbours at Auckland, Wellington and Lyttelton. Two of these guns have since 23 November 1929 been located outside of the northern entrance to the Auckland War Memorial Museum. At the outbreak of World War Two, they were removed with one being returned to service while the other gun which was too damaged to repair, was placed in storage at the museum. Two guns were once again returned to display outside the museum in 1959.

On 12 December 1924 A. Wallace Cowan presented an ink stand and cigar boxes made from the ship's timbers to New Zealand High Commissioner Sir James Allen and current New Zealand Prime Minister William Massey (who was in the United Kingdom at the time), while a third cigar box was sent to Ward. One of these cigar boxes is currently held by the Auckland Museum. Teak from the ship was used as flooring in Cowan's house. A photo album of the breaking up of the vessel was presented by Cowan's daughter to the New Zealand Royal Navy in 1968 and is now held by National Archives New Zealand.

Auckland War Memorial Museum has among its collection Pelorus Jack's silver collar (a gift received from the New Zealanders of Transvaal), another brass-studded collar and his harness. Another collar, gifted by the Pretoria Public Works Department, is held by the Royal New Zealand Navy Museum, Devonport.

The other artifacts are on display in various museums in New Zealand. The hei-tiki donated by C. J. Sloman has been in the Canterbury Museum since 1932. Having once been on display in the Wellington Maritime Museum the auxiliary steering wheel and an engine telegraph are now, together with other items is in the possession of Museum of New Zealand Te Papa Tongarewa in Wellington.

Other than for when it was lent for display at the 1940 Centennial Exhibition in New Zealand the captain's piupiu remained with Halsey until his death in 1949. His daughter Ruth bequeathed it to New Zealand upon her death in 2002 and since 2005 it has been on display at the Torpedo Bay Navy Museum in Auckland alongside the ship's bell and other artifacts. When HMS Queen Mary exploded at the Battle of Jutland debris from the ship fell on New Zealand, among which was a ring-bolt. This is now in the collection of the Torpedo Bay Navy Museum.

The South Canterbury Museum in Timaru, New Zealand, holds the naval ensign which flew from New Zealand during all of its naval engagements in World War I. The naval ensign and a union jack were purchased by the women's branch of the Navy League in Timaru and presented to the ship when it visited Timaru in May 1913.

== Ship's mascot ==
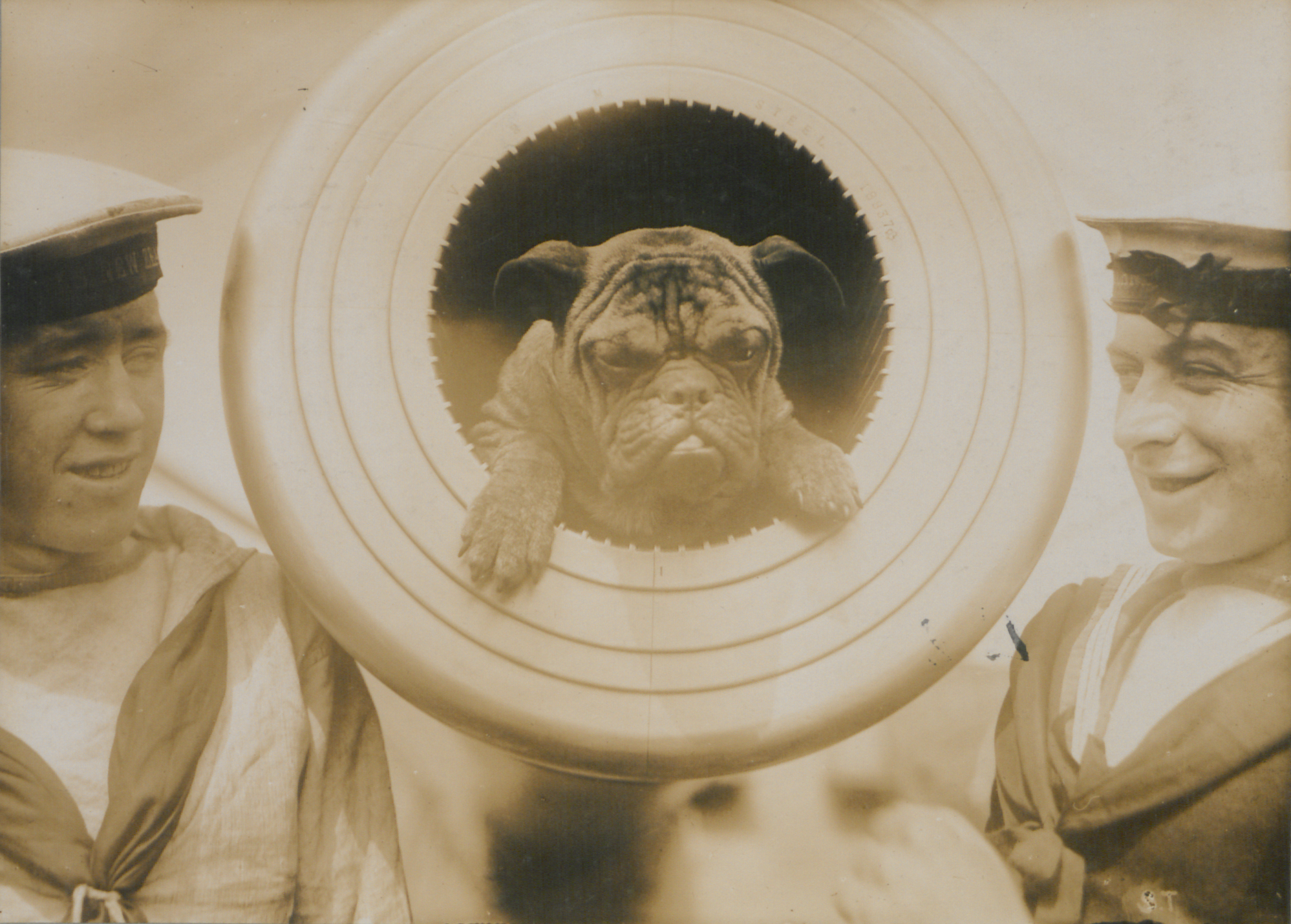
"Pelorus Jack", the ship's mascot in the muzzle of a 12-inch gun (1914).

The ship's first mascot, Pelorus Jack, was a bulldog donated by a New Zealander resident in London and named after the famous dolphin that greeted ships in the Marlborough Sounds of New Zealand. The first was "discharged dead" from the Navy on 24 April 1916 after falling down the forward funnel. His will requested not only that his successor be a "bull pup of honest parentage, clean habits, and moral tendencies", but also that "no Dachshound or other dog of Teutonic extraction" be permitted on board.

His successor's experiences at the Battle of Jutland caused him to become afraid of gunfire and when it was considered it was unlikely he could survive the ship's return voyage to the United Kingdom he was discharged with the rank of leading sea dog and given to the people of Auckland in October 1919. Following six-month quarantine Jack was taken under the care of the superintendent of parks.

== Bibliography ==
- Bailey (1977). The Christmas Island Story. Stacey International. ISBN 0-905743-08-3.
- Burt, R. A. (2012) [1986]. British Battleships of World War One (Revised ed.). Naval Institute Press. ISBN 978-1-59114-053-5.
- Campbell, John (1986). Jutland: An Analysis of the Fighting. Naval Institute Press. ISBN 0-87021-324-5.
- Campbell, N. J. M. (1978). Battle Cruisers. Warship Special. Vol. 1. Conway Maritime Press. ISBN 0-85177-130-0.
- Dodson, Aidan M. (2022). "Warship Gallery: The Scrapping of HMS Agincourt, New Zealand, Princess Royal at Rosyth, 1923—1925". In Jordan, John (ed.). Warship 2022. Osprey Publishing. pp. 219–224. ISBN 978-1-4728-4781-2.
- Frame, Tom (2004). No Pleasure Cruise: The Story of the Royal Australian Navy. Allen & Unwin. ISBN 1-74114-233-4. OCLC 55980812.
- Gordon, Andrew (2006). "The Best Laid Staff Work: An Insider's View of Jellicoe's 1919 Naval Mission to the Dominions". In Forbes, Andrew; Lovi, Michelle (eds.). Australian Maritime Issues 2006: SPC-A Annual (PDF). Papers in Australian Maritime Affairs; No. 19. Sea Power Centre – Australia. pp. 11–23. ISBN 0-642-29644-8. Archived from the original (PDF) on 13 June 2011.
- Henderson, Alan; et al. (2008). The Gunners: A History of New Zealand Artillery. Penguin Group (New Zealand). ISBN 978-0-7900-1141-7.
- Howard, Grant (1981). The Navy in New Zealand: An Illustrated History. A. H. and A. W. Reed. pp. 30–31. ISBN 0-589-01355-6.
- Johnston, Ian & Buxton, Ian (2013). The Battleship Builders – Constructing and Arming British Capital Ships. Naval Institute Press. ISBN 978-1-59114-027-6.
- Jose, Arthur W. (1941) [1928]. The Royal Australian Navy 1914–1918. The Official History of Australia in the War of 1914–1918. Vol. IX (9th ed.). Angus and Robertson. OCLC 215763279. Archived from the original on 4 October 2009.
- Lambert, Nicholas (1996). "Economy or Empire?: The Fleet Unit Concept and the Quest for Collective Security in the Pacific, 1909–14". Far-Flung Lines: Essays on Imperial Defense in Honour of Donald Mackenzie Schurman. Frank Cass. ISBN 0-7146-4216-9.
- Layman, R. D. (1996). Naval Aviation in the First World War. Naval Institute Press. ISBN 1-55750-617-5.
- Marder, Arthur J. (2014) [1978]. From the Dreadnought to Scapa Flow, The Royal Navy in the Fisher Era, 1904–1919. Vol. III: Jutland and After, May 1916 – December 1916 (Second ed.). Naval Institute Press. ISBN 978-1-84832-200-4.
- Massie, Robert (2004). Castles of Steel: Britain, Germany and the Winning of the Great War. Random House. ISBN 0-224-04092-8.
- Newbolt, Henry (1996) [1931]. Naval Operations. History of the Great War Based on Official Documents. Vol. V. Battery Press. ISBN 0-89839-255-1.
- Parkes, Oscar (1990) [1966]. British Battleships, Warrior 1860 to Vanguard 1950: A History of Design, Construction, and Armament (New & rev. ed.). Naval Institute Press. ISBN 1-55750-075-4.
- Pelvin, Richard (2018). "The Battlecruiser Australia (1911)". In Taylor, Bruce (ed.). The World of the Battleship: The Lives and Careers of Twenty-One Capital Ships of the World's Navies, 1880–1990. Seaforth Publishing. ISBN 978-0-87021-906-1.
- Preston, Antony (1985). "Great Britain and Empire Forces". In Gray, Randal (ed.). Conway's All the World's Fighting Ships 1906–1921. Naval Institute Press. pp. 1–104. ISBN 0-85177-245-5.
- Roberts, John (1997). Battlecruisers. Naval Institute Press. ISBN 1-55750-068-1.
- Tarrant, V. E. (1999) [1995]. Jutland: The German Perspective: A New View of the Great Battle, 31 May 1916. Brockhampton Press. ISBN 1-86019-917-8.
- Till, Geoffrey (2014). Understanding Victory: Naval Operations from Trafalgar to the Falklands. Praeger. ISBN 978-0-275-98724-4.
- Wright, Matthew J. (2021). The Battlecruiser New Zealand: A Gift to Empire. Naval Institute Press. ISBN 978-1-5267-8403-2. OCLC 1206393324.
