= Peter Adds =

New Zealand indigenous issues academic

Peter Adds is Wellington-based academic, treaty negotiator and former head of Victoria University of Wellington's Te Kawa a Māui/School of Māori Studies. He is of Te Āti Awa descent. With a background in anthropology and archaeology, he has interests in Treaty of Waitangi settlements, indigenous astronomy, Māori development, and international indigenous issues.

Adds is the founding head of the Māori Association of Social Science, and has campaigned for a less government-sided view of New Zealand history to be taught in schools.

A 2014 thesis by Dougal Austin, supervised by Adds and based on a survey of the collection of hei-tiki at Te Papa Tongarewa and early-contact examples in foreign collections, found that the mana of hei tiki is derived from the "agency of prolonged ancestral use" and stylistically was "highly developed [...] from the outset to conform to adze-shaped pieces of pounamu."

== Selected works ==
- Contested Ground: Te Whenua I Tohea, the Taranaki Wars 1860–1881, chapter Te Muru me te Raupatu: The Aftermath ISBN 9781869694111 (won the Nga Kupu Ora Maori Book Awards)
- A Brilliant Civilisation in The transit of Venus: how a rare astronomical alignment changed the world. Wellington, Awa Press, 2007, ISBN 9780958262972. (shortlisted for the Montana Book Awards 2008)
- First Footprints: People, Land and Resources in Aotearoa. Auckland. Pearsons, 2006. ISBN 9781442541993
