= Manaia (mythological creature) =

Mythological creature in Māori culture

Manaia pounamu carving

The Manaia is a mythological creature in Māori culture, and is a common motif in Māori carving and jewellery.

The Manaia is usually depicted as having the head of a bird and the tail of a fish and the body of a man, though it is sometimes depicted as a bird, a serpent, or a human figure in profile. Other interpretations include a seahorse and a lizard. The word manaia is cognate with the founding Samoan term fa'amanaia, and relevant to the Niuean fakamanaia, both meaning to make a decoration or embellishment.

The Manaia is traditionally believed to be the messenger between the earthly world of mortals and the domain of the spirits, and its symbol is used as a guardian against evil. In this form, it is usually represented in a figure-of-eight shape, the upper half culminating in a bird-like beak. This form was also widely used in designs of door and window lintels and other architectural features, as well as in ceremonial hafts of weapons. A study of Māori carving suggests that every naturalistic figure there is an equivalent Manaia form which can be seen as a distorted profile-face version of the equivalent full-face figure. It may be that the Manaia represents some spiritual or inner facet of the full face figure.

Related Manaia-like symbols are also found in other Polynesian cultures, such as in Hawaii and Easter Island.

The manaia is a useful motif in carving, as it can be distorted to fit any shape and blended into many different designs. As such, it can be used to fill the empty spaces in wood carving, and in many compositions the background between the main figures is filled in with Manaia. It is a very common form in Maori jewellery (possibly only less common than the hei-tiki and hei matau), and is often found worn as a pendant carved from bone or greenstone. Manaia designs vary subtly in form between iwi, though they are often depicted as three-fingered, with these digits representing the trinity of birth, life, and death. A fourth finger, representing the circular rhythms of the life cycle and the afterlife, is also sometimes shown.

== See also ==
- Hei-tiki
- Hei matau
