= Greenstone =

Greenstone may refer to:

== Geology ==
- Greenstone (archaeology), various types of stone used by early cultures, covering jade and similar stones
- Greenstone belt, Archean and Proterozoic volcanic–sedimentary rock sequences
- Isle Royale greenstone Chlorastrolite, found in the Keweenaw Peninsula of Michigan and Isle Royale in the US
- Pounamu (New Zealand jade/greenstone), several types of hard and durable stone found in southern New Zealand
- Greensand (geology), glauconite bearing sandstone and a geologic formation in the UK
- Greenschist, metamorphosed mafic volcanic rock and a metamorphic facies
- Elvan, a quartz-porphyry found in Cornwall, UK

== Places ==
- Greenstone, Ontario, a municipality in Canada
- Greenstone, Queensland, a locality in the Moreton Bay Region, Australia
- Greenstone Hill, a suburb of Johannesburg, South Africa
- Greenstone Point, a high rock spur along the north front of Jones Mountains, Antarctica
- Greenstone River, river in the Otago/Southland region, New Zealand

== Other ==
- Greenstone (software), an open source digital library software package
- Greenstone Building, a Canadian government building in Yellowknife
- Greenstone Financial Services, an Australian insurance distributor
- Greenstone TV, a television production company, New Zealand
- Greenstone, the generics division of Pfizer

== See also ==
- List of greenstone belts
- Marion Greenstone (1925–2005), American artist
