= Jade =

Ornamental stone, commonly green

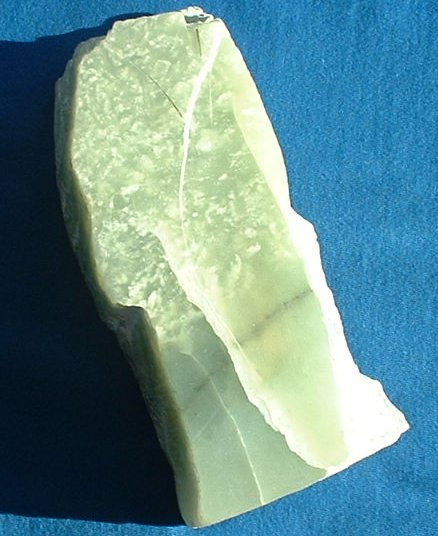
- A slab of jade

General
- Category: Minerals
- Crystal system: Monoclinic

Identification
- Color: Virtually all colors, mostly green
- Crystal habit: Intergrown grainy or fine fibrous aggregate
- Cleavage: None
- Fracture: Splintery
- Tenacity: Brittle
- Mohs scale hardness: 6–7
- Luster: waxy
- Streak: colorless
- Diaphaneity: Translucent, opaque
- Specific gravity: 2.9–3.38
- Refractive index: 1.600–1.688
- Birefringence: 0.020–0.027
- Pleochroism: Absent
- Dispersion: None

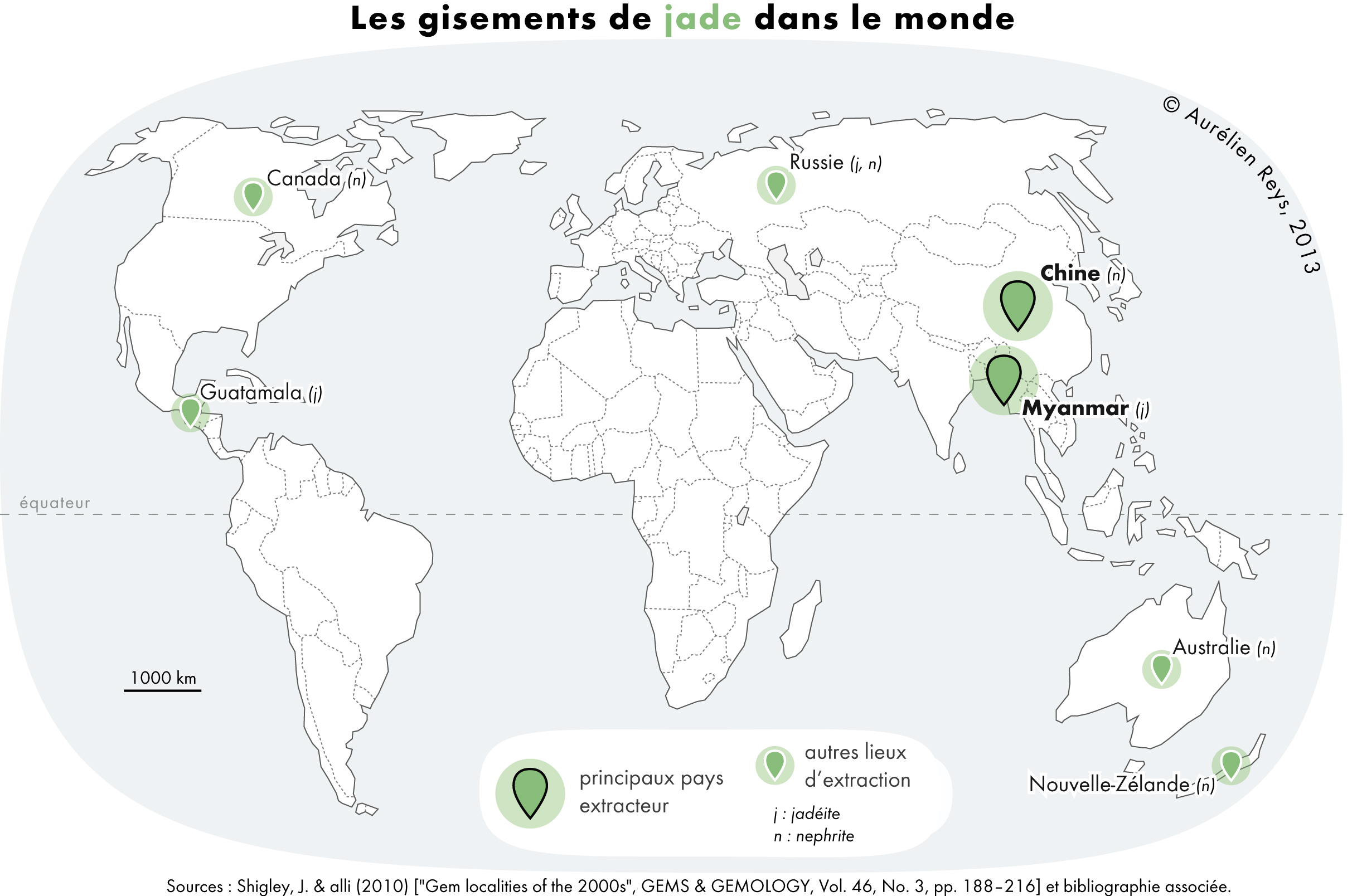
Main jade producing countries

Jade is an umbrella term for two different types of decorative rocks used for jewelry or ornaments. Jade is often referred to by either of two different silicate mineral names: nephrite (a silicate of calcium and magnesium in the amphibole group of minerals), or jadeite (a silicate of sodium and aluminum in the pyroxene group of minerals). Nephrite is typically green, although it may be yellow, white or black. Jadeite varies from white or near-colorless, through various shades of green (including an emerald green, termed 'imperial'), to lavender, yellow, orange, brown and black. Rarely it may be blue. Both of these names refer to their use as gemstones, and each has a mineralogically more specific name. Both the amphibole jade (nephrite) and pyroxene jade are mineral aggregates (rocks) rather than mineral species.

Nephrite was deprecated by the International Mineralogical Association as a mineral species name in 1975 (replaced by tremolite). The name "nephrite" is mineralogically correct for referring to the rock. Jadeite is a legitimate mineral species, differing from the pyroxene jade rock. In China, the name jadeite has been replaced with fei cui, the traditional Chinese name for this gem that was in use long before Damour created the name in 1863.

Jade is well known for its ornamental use in East Asian, South Asian, and Southeast Asian art. It is commonly used in Latin America, such as Mexico and Guatemala. The use of jade in Mesoamerica for symbolic and ideological ritual was influenced by its rarity and value among pre-Columbian Mesoamerican cultures, such as the Olmecs, the Maya, and other ancient civilizations of the Valley of Mexico.

Jade is classified into three main types: Type A, Type B, and Type C. Type A jade refers to natural, untreated jadeite jade, prized for its purity and vibrant colors. It is the most valuable and sought-after type, often characterized by its vivid green hues and high translucency. Type A jade is revered for its symbolism of purity, harmony, and protection in various cultures, especially in East Asia where it holds significant cultural and spiritual importance. Types B and C have been enhanced with resin and colourant respectively.

== Etymology ==
Jade

Chinese name
- Chinese: 玉
Transcriptions
Standard Mandarin
- Hanyu Pinyin: yù
- IPA: [ŷ]
Yue: Cantonese
- Yale Romanization: yuhk
- Jyutping: juk^{6}
- IPA: [jʊk̚˨]

Alternative Chinese name
- Chinese: 翡翠
Transcriptions
Standard Mandarin
- Hanyu Pinyin: fěicuì
- IPA: [fèɪ.tsʰwêɪ]
Yue: Cantonese
- Jyutping: fei^{2}ceoi^{3}
Southern Min
- Hokkien POJ: húi-chhùi
- Teochew Peng'im: hui^{1}cui^{3}

Vietnamese name
- Vietnamese alphabet: ngọc
- Chữ Hán: 玉

Korean name
- Hangul: 옥, 비취
- Hanja: 玉, 翡翠
Transcriptions
- Revised Romanization: ok, bichwi

Japanese name
- Kanji: 玉, 翡翠
Transcriptions
- Romanization: gyoku, hisui

The English word jade is derived (via French l'ejade and Latin ilia 'flanks, kidney area') from the Spanish term piedra de ijada (first recorded in 1565) or 'flank stone', from its reputed efficacy in curing ailments of the loins and kidneys. Nephrite is derived from lapis nephriticus, a Latin translation of the Spanish piedra de ijada.

== History ==
=== East Asia ===
==== Prehistoric and historic China ====
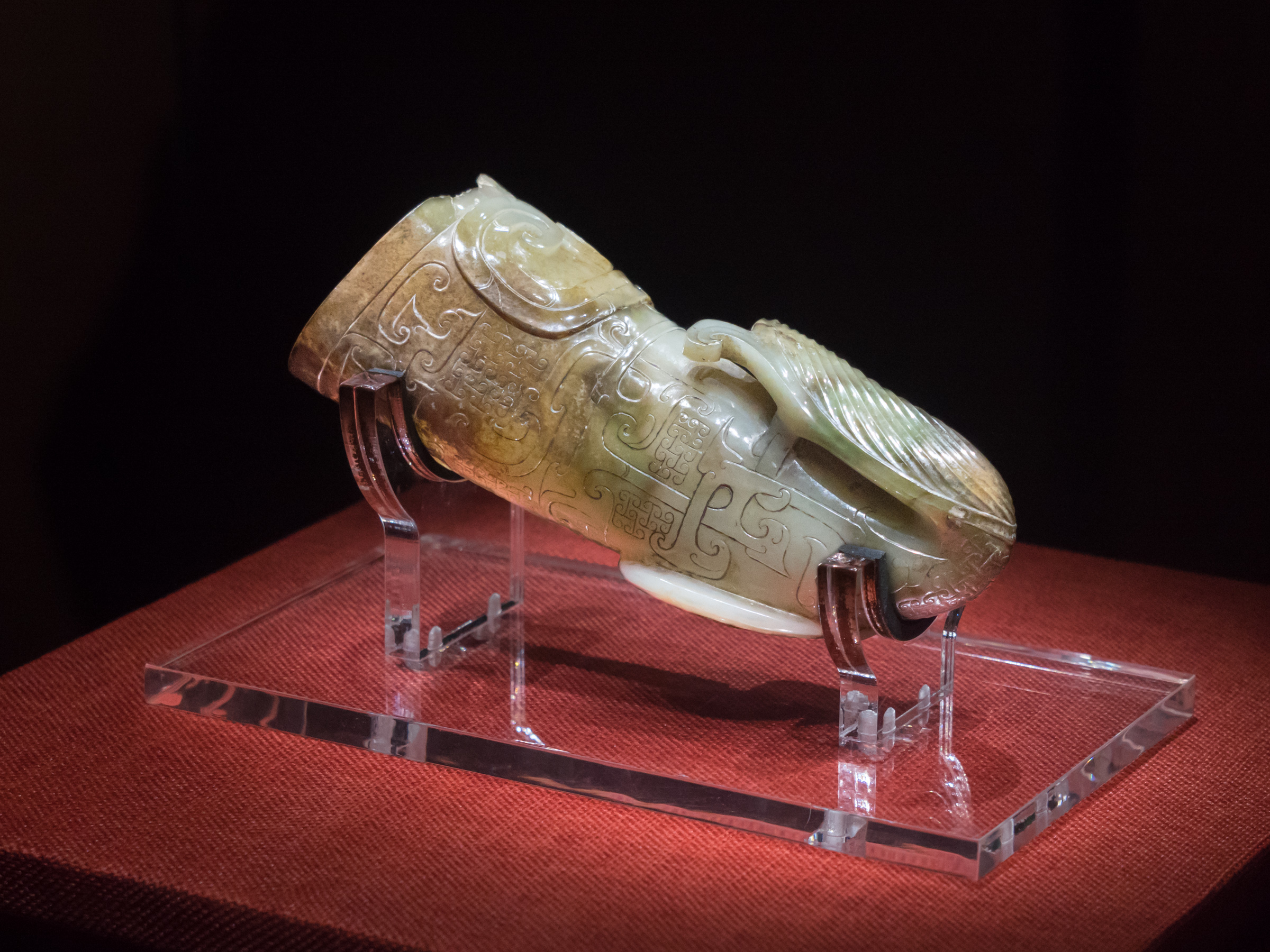
Jade Drinking Vessel in Rhino Horn Shape, Western Han/Nanyue (202 BC – 111 BC)

During Neolithic times, the key known sources of nephrite jade in China for utilitarian and ceremonial jade items were the now-depleted deposits in the Ningshao area in the Yangtze River Delta (Liangzhu culture 3400–2250 BC) and in an area of the Liaoning province and Inner Mongolia (Hongshan culture 4700–2200 BC). Dushan Jade (a rock composed largely of anorthite feldspar and zoisite) was being mined as early as 6000 BC. In the Yin Ruins of the Shang Dynasty (1600 to 1050 BC) in Anyang, Dushan Jade ornaments were unearthed in the tomb of the Shang kings.

Jade was considered to be the "imperial gem" and was used to create many utilitarian and ceremonial objects, from indoor decorative items to jade burial suits. From the earliest Chinese dynasties to the present, the jade deposits most used were not only those of Khotan in the Western Chinese province of Xinjiang but other parts of China as well, such as Lantian, Shaanxi province. There, white and greenish nephrite jade is found in small quarries and as pebbles and boulders in the rivers flowing from the Kuen-Lun mountain range eastward into the Takla-Makan desert area. The river jade collection is concentrated in the Yarkand, the White Jade (Yurungkash) and Black Jade (Karakash) Rivers. From the Kingdom of Khotan, on the southern leg of the Silk Road, yearly tribute payments consisting of the most precious white jade were made to the Chinese Imperial court and there worked into objets d'art by skilled artisans as jade had a status-value exceeding that of gold or silver. Jade became a favourite material for the crafting of Chinese scholars' objects, such as rests for calligraphy brushes, as well as the mouthpieces of some opium pipes, due to the belief that breathing through jade would bestow longevity upon smokers who used such a pipe.

Jadeite, with its bright emerald-green, lavender, pink, orange, yellow, red, black, white, near-colorless and brown colors was imported from Burma to China in quantity only after about 1800. The vivid white to green variety became known as fei cui (翡翠) or kingfisher jade, due to its resemblance to the feathers of the kingfisher bird. That definition was later expanded to include all other colors that the rock is found in. It quickly became almost as popular as nephrite and a favorite of Qing Dynasty's aristocracy, while scholars still had strong attachment to nephrite (white jade, or Hetian jade), which they deemed to be the symbol of a nobleman.

In the history of the art of the Chinese empire, jade has had a special significance, comparable with that of gold and diamonds in the West. Jade was used for the finest objects and cult figures, and for grave furnishings for high-ranking members of the imperial family. Due to that significance and the rising middle class in China, in 2010 the finest jade when found in nuggets of "mutton fat" jade – so-named for its marbled white consistency – could sell for $3,000 an ounce, a tenfold increase from a decade previously.

The Chinese character 玉 (yù) is used to denote the several types of stone known in English as "jade" (e.g. 玉器, jadewares), such as jadeite (硬玉, 'hard jade', another name for 翡翠) and nephrite (軟玉, 'soft jade'). While still in use, the terms "hard jade" and "soft jade" resulted from a mistranslation by a Japanese geologist, and should be avoided.

But because of the value added culturally to jades throughout Chinese history, the word has also come to refer more generally to precious or ornamental stones, and is very common in more symbolic usage as in phrases like 拋磚引玉/抛砖引玉 (lit. "casting a brick (i.e. the speaker's own words) to draw a jade (i.e. pearls of wisdom from the other party)"), 玉容 (a beautiful face; "jade countenance"), and 玉立 (slim and graceful; "jade standing upright"). The character has a similar range of meanings when appearing as a radical as parts of other characters.

==== Prehistoric and historic Japan ====
Jade is the national gemstone of Japan and has long been viewed as a symbol of wealth and power. Examples of its use in Japan can be traced back to the early Jomon period about 7,000 years ago. XRF analysis results have revealed that all jade used in Japan since the Jomon period is from Itoigawa. The jade culture that blossomed in ancient Japan valued green gems, and jade of other colors was not used. There is a theory that the reason for this was the belief that the color green symbolizes fertility, the reproduction of life, and the soul of the earth.

==== Prehistoric and historic Korea ====
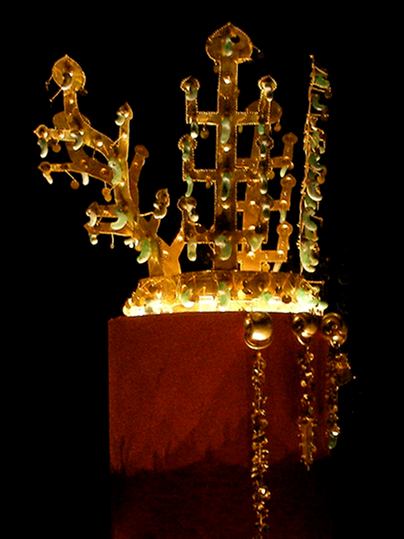
Golden crown with jade pendants from Silla, fifth or sixth century AD, in the National Museum of Korea.

The use of jade and other greenstone was a long-term tradition in Korea (c. 850 BC – AD 668). Jade is found in small numbers of pit-houses and burials. The craft production of small comma-shaped and tubular "jades" using materials such as jade, microcline, jasper, etc., in southern Korea originates from the Middle Mumun Pottery Period (c. 850–550 BC). Comma-shaped jades are found on some of the gold crowns of Silla royalty (c. 300/400–668 AD) and sumptuous elite burials of the Korean Three Kingdoms. After the state of Silla united the Korean Peninsula in 668, the widespread popularisation of death rituals related to Buddhism resulted in the decline of the use of jade in burials as prestige mortuary goods.

=== South Asia ===
==== India ====
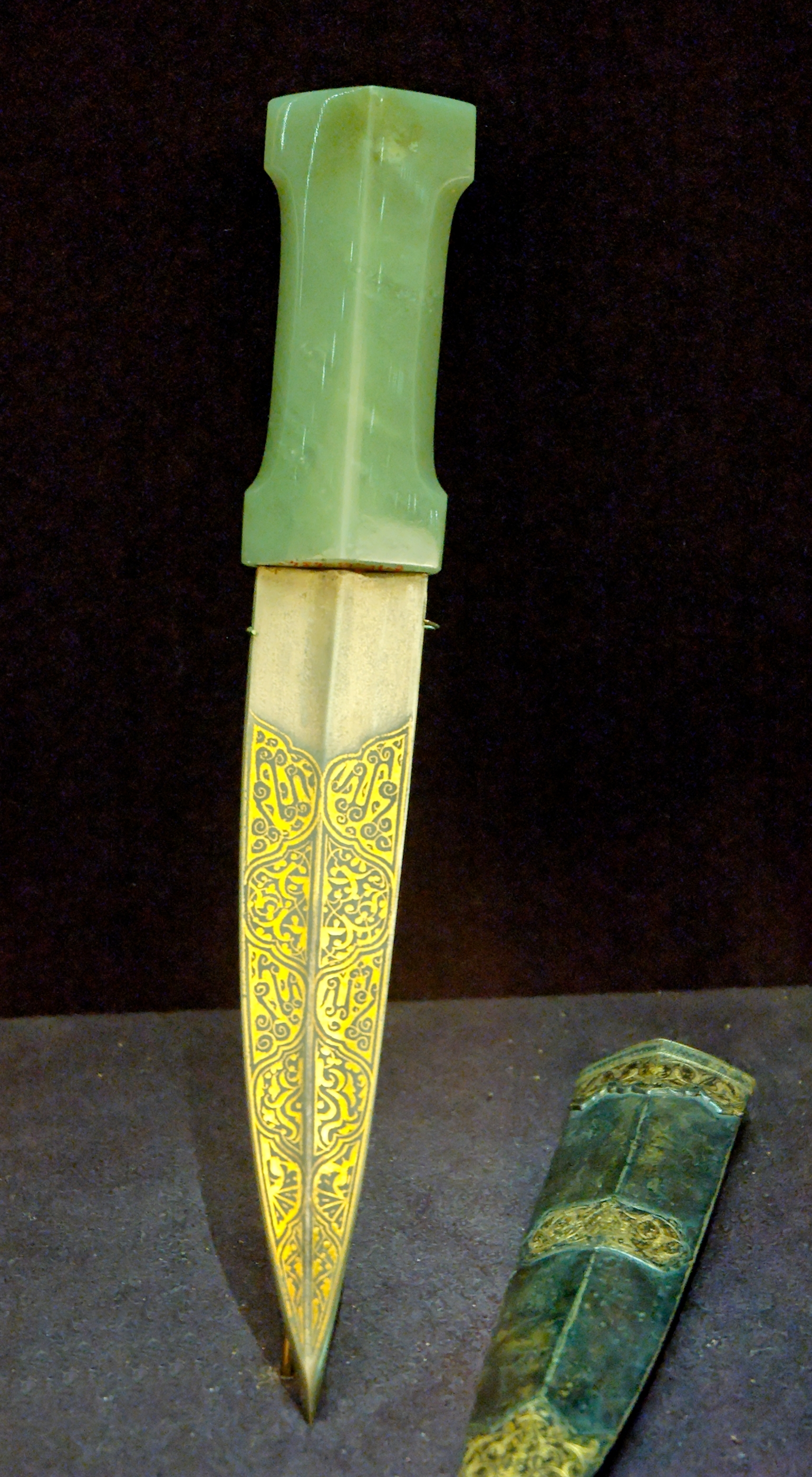
Dagger with jade hilt, India, 17th–18th century. Louvre

The Jain temple of Kolanpak in the Nalgonda district, Telangana, India is home to a 5-foot (1.5 m) high sculpture of Mahavira that is carved entirely out of jade. India is also noted for its craftsman tradition of using large amounts of green serpentine or false jade obtained primarily from Afghanistan in order to fashion jewellery and ornamental items such as sword hilts and dagger handles.

The Salar Jung Museum in Hyderabad has a wide range of jade hilted daggers, mostly owned by the former Nizams of Hyderabad.

=== Southeast Asia ===
==== Myanmar ====
Today, it is estimated that Myanmar is the origin of upwards of 70% of the world's supply of high-quality jadeite. Most of the jadeite mined in Myanmar is not cut for use in Myanmar, instead being transported to other nations, primarily in Asia, for use in jewelry and other products. The jadeite deposits found in Kachin State, in Myanmar's northern regions is the highest quality jadeite in the world, considered precious by sources in China going as far back as the 10th century.

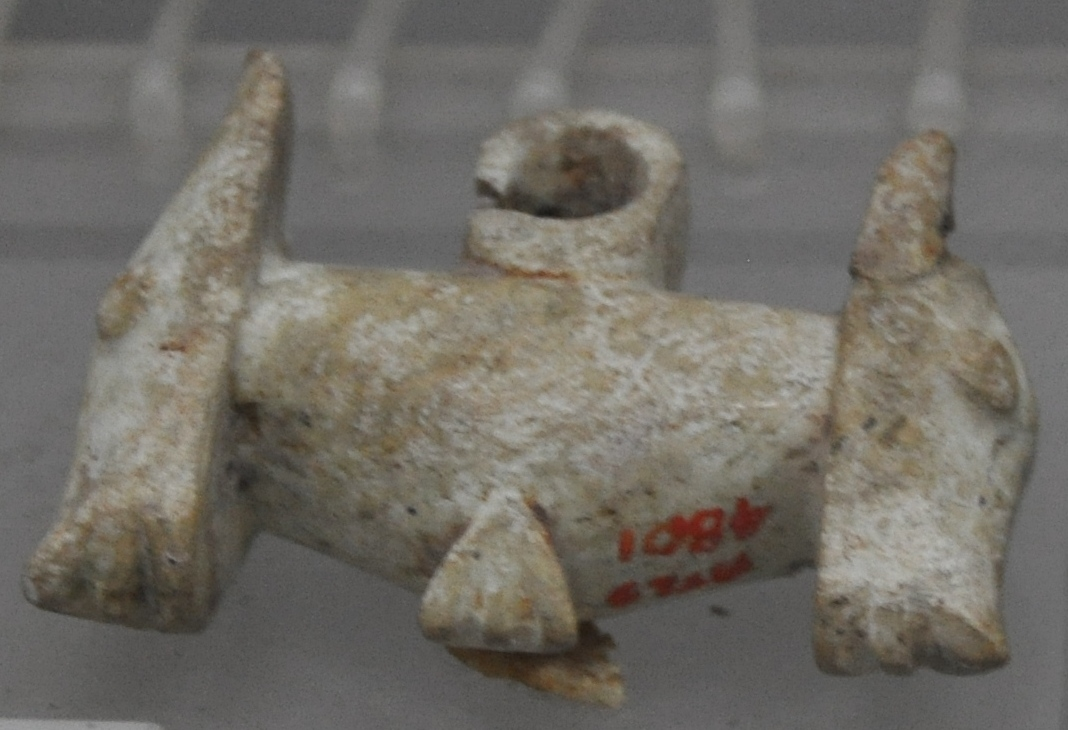
Sa Huỳnh white jade lingling-o double-headed pendant from Vietnam

Jadeite in Myanmar is primarily found in the "Jade Tract" located in Lonkin Township in Kachin State in northern Myanmar which encompasses the alluvial region of the Uyu River between the 25th and 26th parallels. Present-day extraction of jade in this region occurs at the Phakant-gyi, Maw Sisa, Tin Tin, and Khansee mines. Khansee is also the only mine that produces maw sit sit, a kosmochlor-rich jade rock. Mines at Tawmaw and Hweka are mostly exhausted. From 1964 to 1981, mining was exclusively an enterprise of the Myanmar government. In 1981, 1985, and 1995, the Gemstone laws were modified to allow increasing private enterprise. In addition to this region, there are also notable mines in the neighboring Sagaing District, near the towns of Nasibon and Natmaw and Hkamti. Sagaing is a district in Myanmar proper, not a part of the ethnic Kachin State.

==== Southeast Asia ====
Carved nephrite jade was the main commodity trade of an extensive prehistoric trading network connecting multiple areas in Southeast Asia. The nephrite jade was mined in eastern Taiwan by the animist Taiwanese indigenous peoples and processed mostly in the Philippines by the animist indigenous Filipinos. Some were also processed in Vietnam, while the peoples of Brunei, Cambodia, Indonesia, Malaysia, Singapore, and Thailand also participated in the massive animist-led nephrite jade trading network, where other commodities were also traded. Participants in the network at the time had a majority animist population. The maritime road is one of the most extensive sea-based trade networks of a single geological material in the prehistoric world. It was in existence for at least 3,000 years, where its peak production was from 2000 BCE to 500 CE, older than the Silk Road in mainland Eurasia. It began to wane during its final centuries from 500 CE until 1000 CE. The entire period of the network was a golden age for the diverse animist societies of the region.

=== Others ===
==== Māori ====
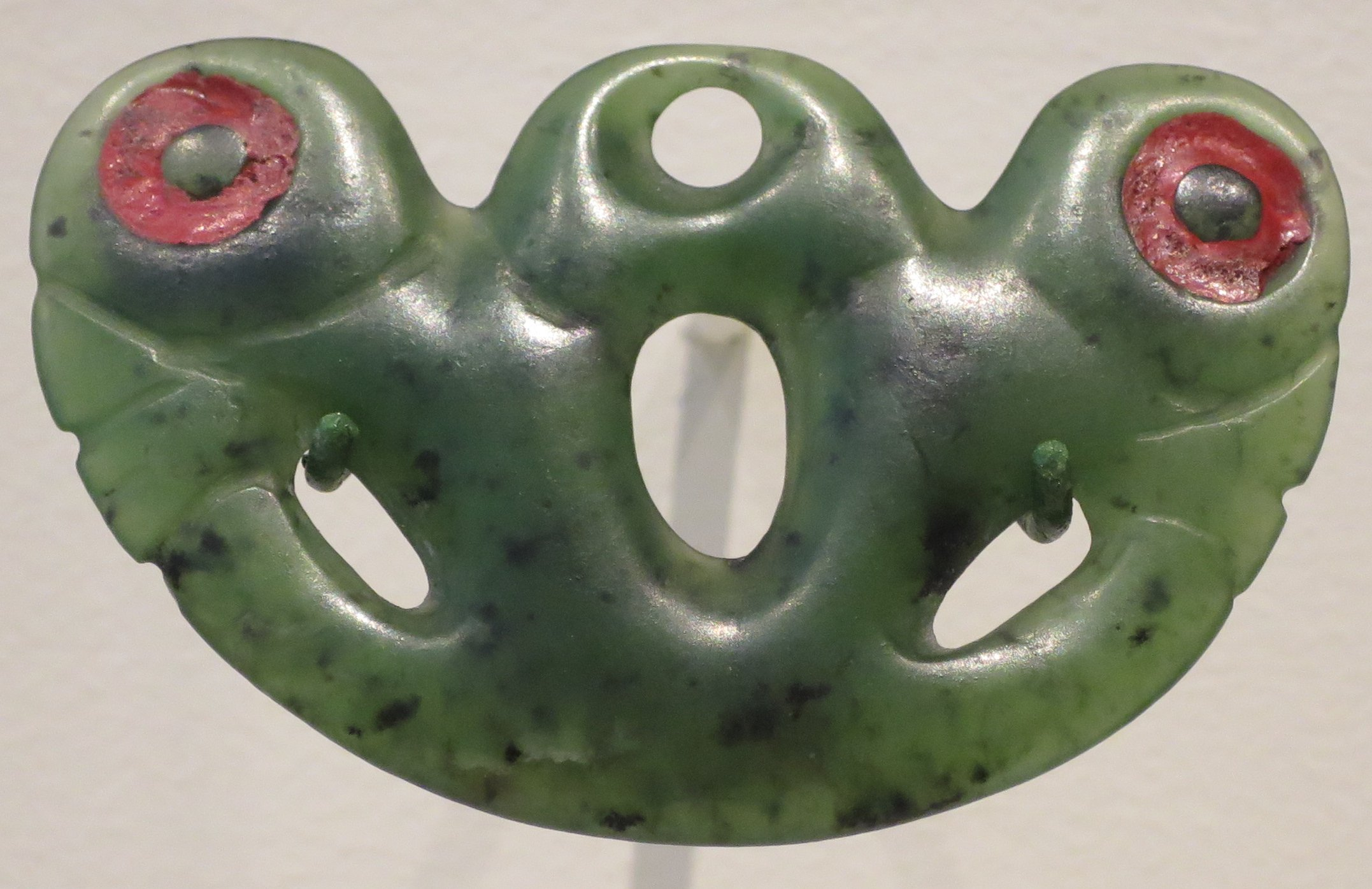
Māori greenstone double-headed pendant (pekapeka) from New Zealand

Māori hei matau jade pendant

Nephrite jade in New Zealand is known as pounamu in the Māori language (often called "greenstone" in New Zealand English), and plays an important role in Māori culture. It is considered a taonga, or treasure, and therefore protected under the Treaty of Waitangi, and the exploitation of it is restricted and closely monitored. It is found only in the South Island of New Zealand, known as Te Wai Pounamu in Māori—"The [land of] Greenstone Water", or Te Wahi Pounamu—"The Place of Greenstone".

Pounamu taonga increase in mana (prestige) as they pass from one generation to another. The most prized taonga are those with known histories going back many generations. These are believed to have their own mana and were often given as gifts to seal important agreements.

Tools, weapons and ornaments were made of it; in particular adzes, the 'mere' (short club), and the hei-tiki (neck pendant). Nephrite jewellery of Maori design is widely popular with locals and tourists, although some of the jade used for these is now imported from British Columbia and elsewhere.

Pounamu taonga include tools such as toki (adzes), whao (chisels), whao whakakōka (gouges), ripi pounamu (knives), scrapers, awls, hammer stones, and drill points. Hunting tools include matau (fishing hooks) and lures, spear points, and kākā poria (leg rings for fastening captive birds); weapons such as mere (short handled clubs); and ornaments such as pendants (hei-tiki, hei matau and pekapeka), ear pendants (kuru and kapeu), and cloak pins. Functional pounamu tools were widely worn for both practical and ornamental reasons, and continued to be worn as purely ornamental pendants (hei kakï) even after they were no longer used as tools.

==== Mesoamerica ====
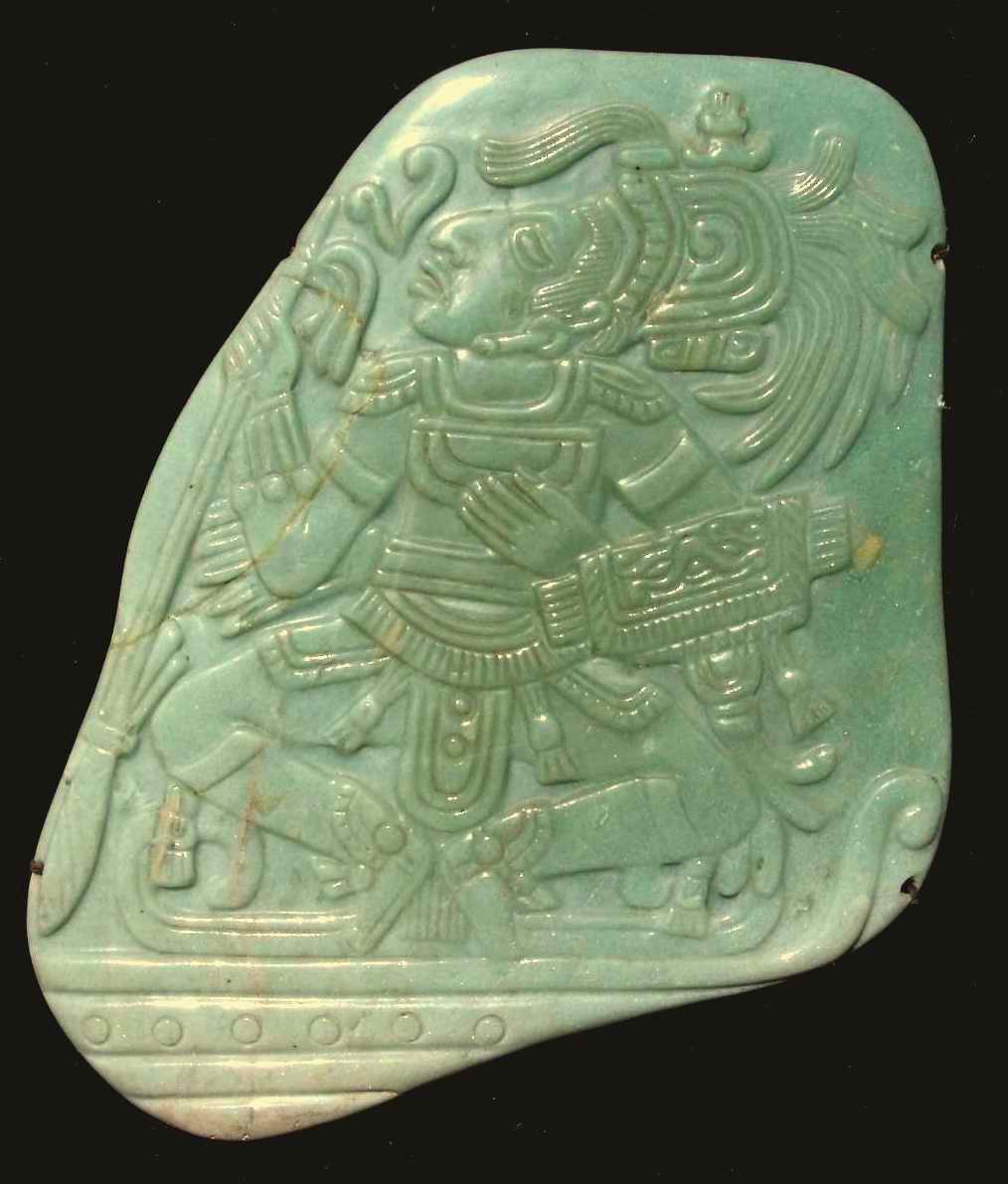
Jadeite pectoral from the Mayan Classic period (195 mm or 7.7 in high)

Jade was a rare and valued material in pre-Columbian Mesoamerica. The only source from which the various indigenous cultures, such as the Olmec and Maya, could obtain jade was located in the Motagua River valley in Guatemala. Jade was largely an elite good, and was usually carved in various ways, whether serving as a medium upon which hieroglyphs were inscribed, or shaped into symbolic figurines. Generally, the material was highly symbolic, and it was often employed in the performance of ideological practices and rituals. One such example was glyph jewelry for Chalchiuhtlicue, the Aztec Goddess of Water, whose jade necklace implied femininity and water.

==== Canada ====
Jade was first identified in Canada by Chinese settlers in 1886 in British Columbia. At this time jade was considered worthless because the settlers were searching for gold. Jade was not commercialized in Canada until the 1970s. The mining business Loex James Ltd., which was started by two Californians, began commercial mining of Canadian jade in 1972.

Mining is done from large boulders that contain bountiful deposits of jade. Jade is exposed using diamond-tipped core drills in order to extract samples. This is done to ensure that the jade meets requirements. Hydraulic spreaders are then inserted into cleavage points in the rock so that the jade can be broken away. Once the boulders are removed and the jade is accessible, it is broken down into more manageable 10-tonne pieces using water-cooled diamond saws. The jade is then loaded onto trucks and transported to the proper storage facilities.

==== Russia ====
Russia imported jade from China for a long time, but in the 1860s its own jade deposits were found in Siberia. Today, the main deposits of jade are located in Eastern Siberia, but jade is also extracted in the Polar Urals and in the Krasnoyarsk territory (Kantegirskoye and Kurtushibinskoye deposits). Russian raw jade reserves are estimated at 336 tons. Russian jade culture is closely connected with such jewellery production as Fabergé, whose workshops combined the green stone with gold, diamonds, emeralds, and rubies.

==== Siberia and Mongolia ====
In the 1950s and 1960s, there was a strong belief among many Siberians and Mongolians, which stemmed from tradition, that jade was part of a class of sacred objects that had life.

== Gallery ==
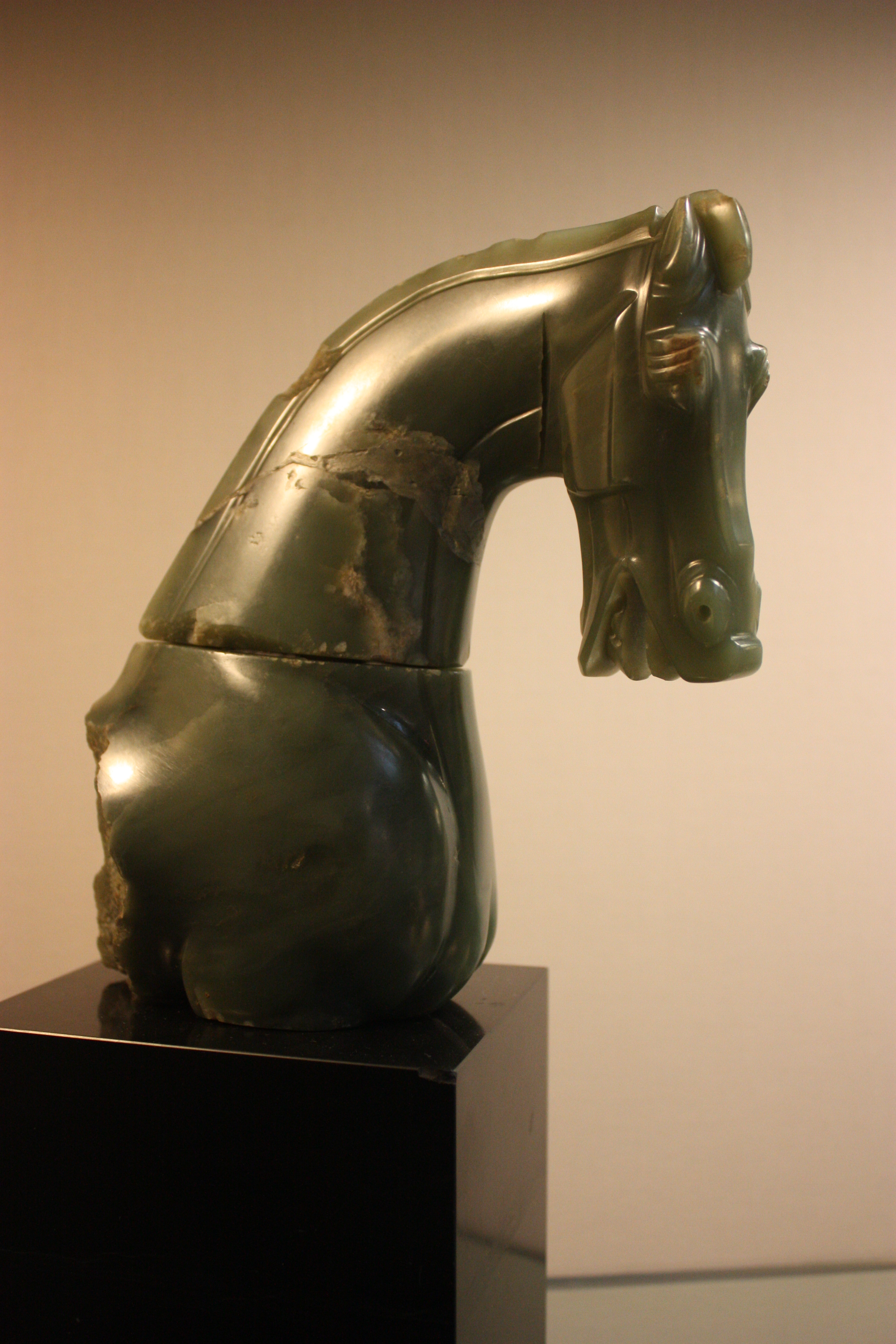
Head and torso fragment of a jade statuette of a horse, Chinese Eastern Han period (25–220 AD)

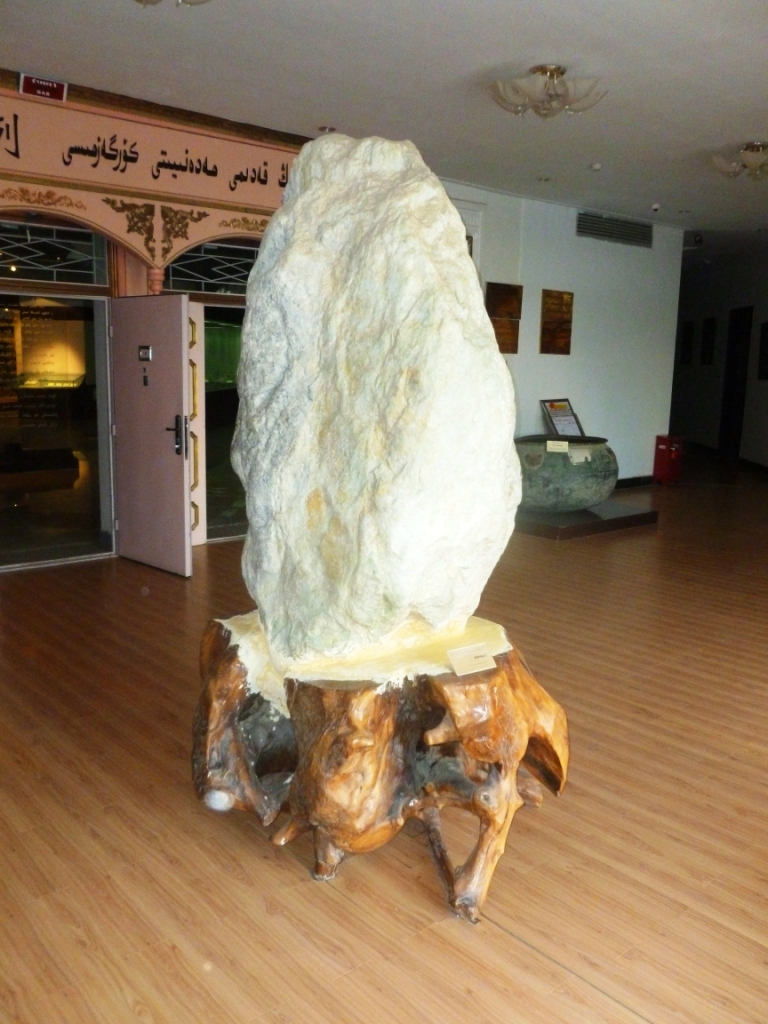
Large "mutton fat" nephrite jade displayed in Hotan Cultural Museum lobby.

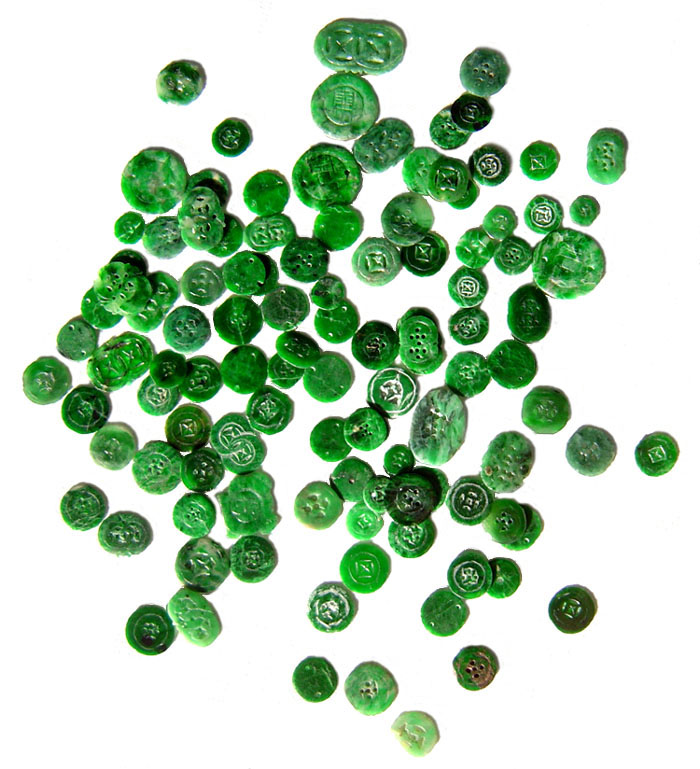
A selection of antique, hand-crafted Chinese jade buttons

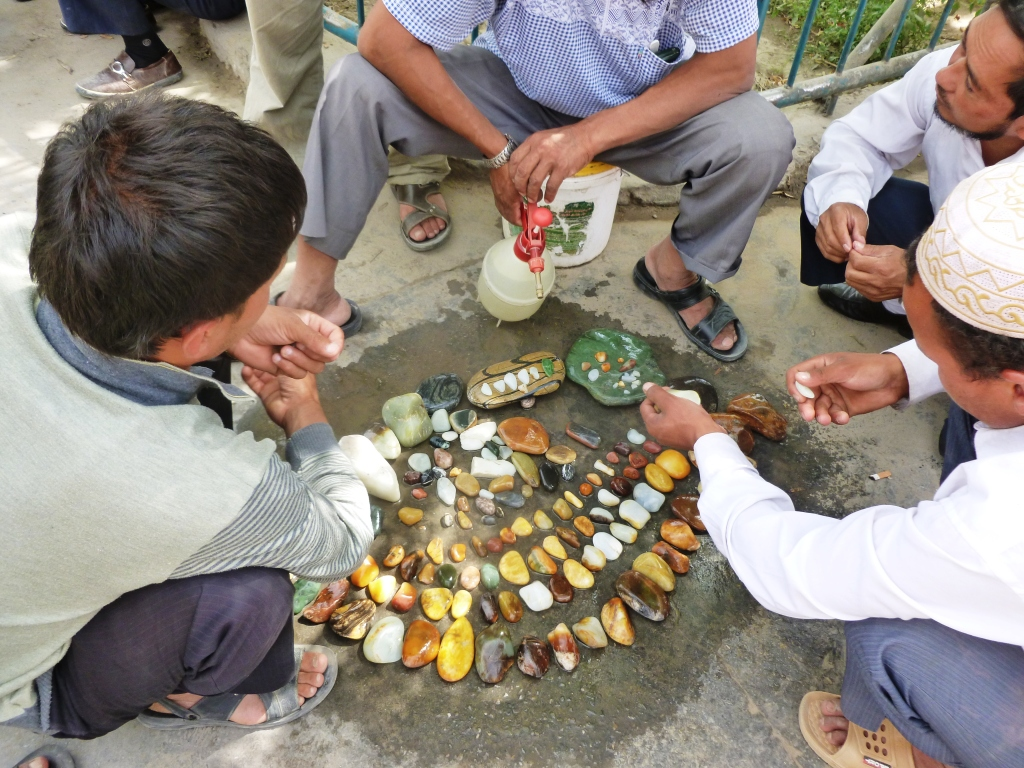
Jade stones for sale at Khotan Jade Market

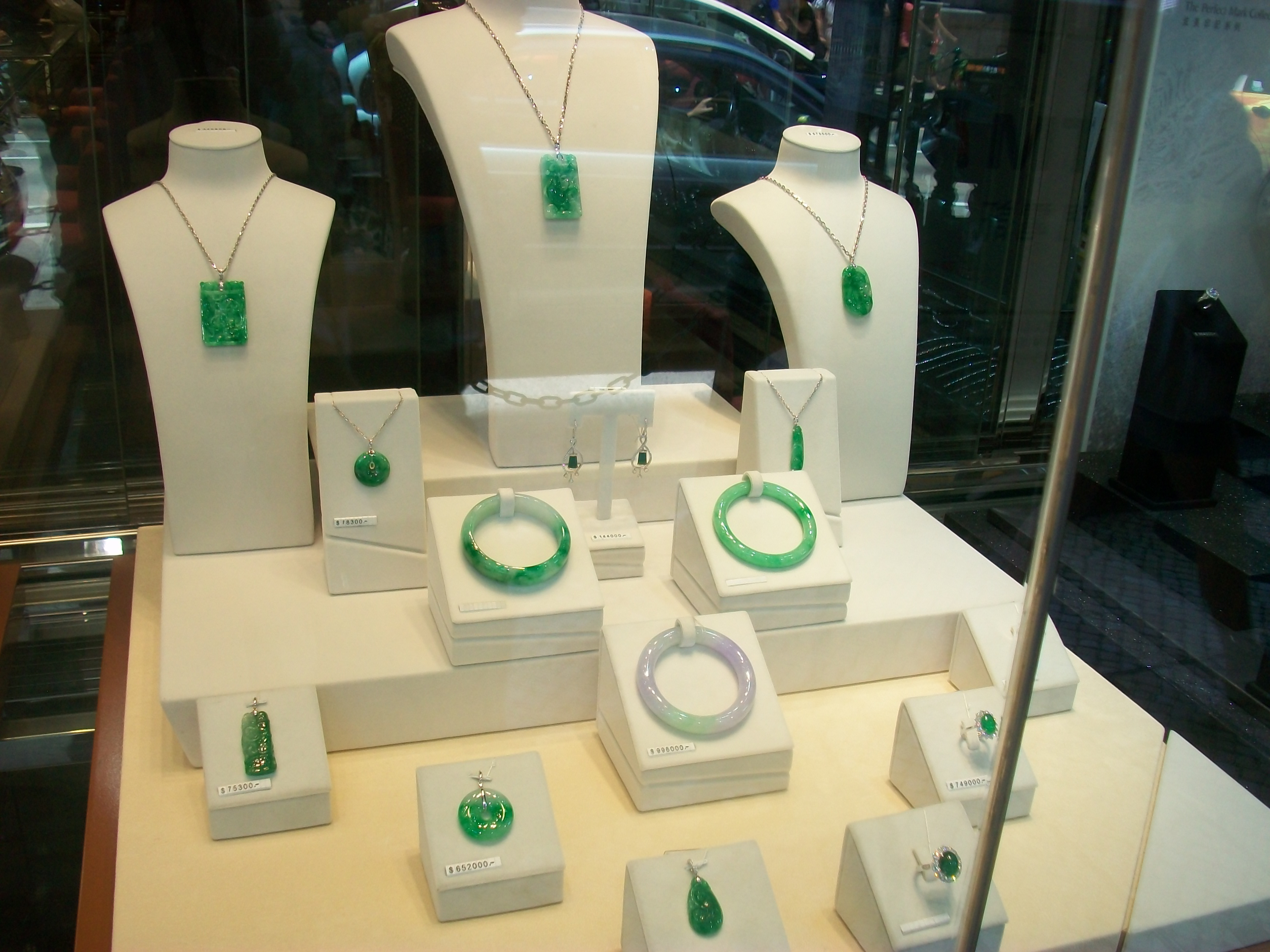
Jade jewelry

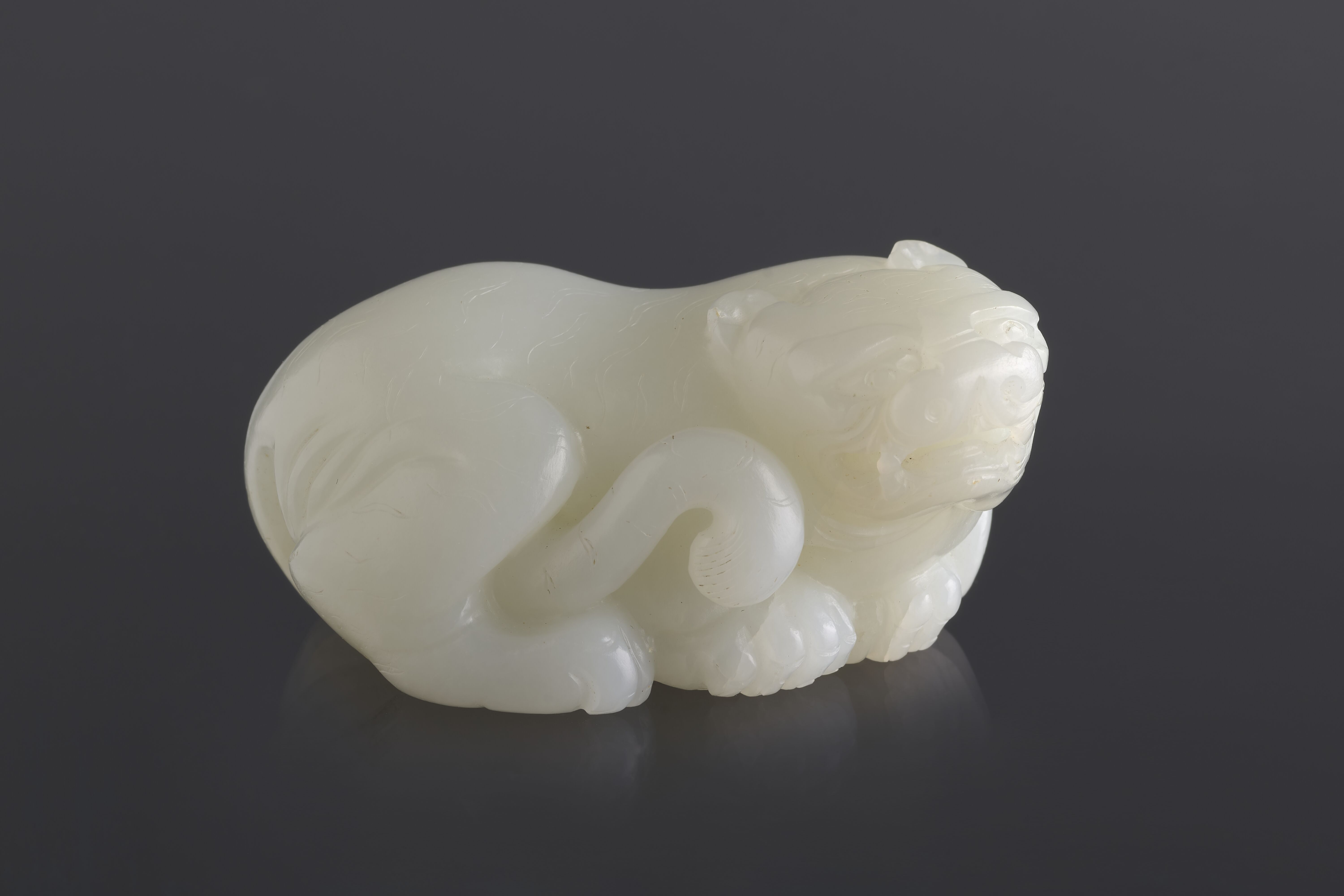
Jade paperweight, China, 18th century, National Museum in Warsaw

== The mineral ==
=== Nephrite and jadeite ===
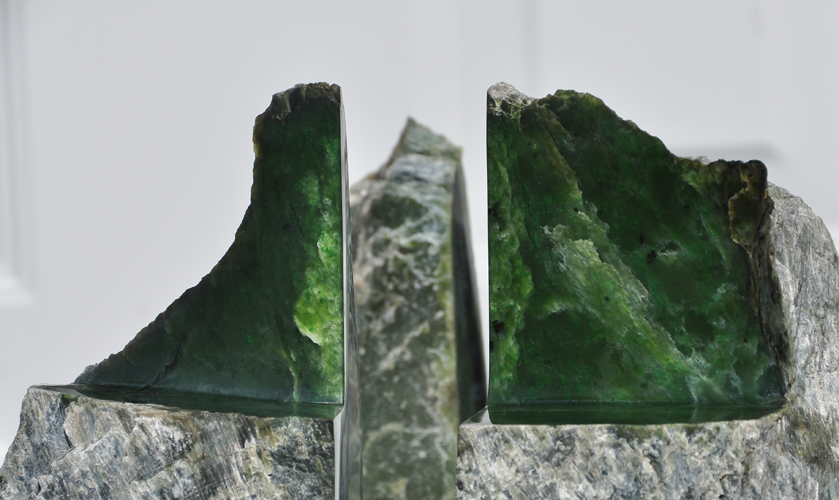
Jade on display in Jade City, British Columbia, Canada

It was not until 1863 that French mineralogist Alexis Damour determined that what was referred to as "jade" could in fact be one of two different minerals, either nephrite or jadeite.

Nephrite consists of a microcrystalline interlocking fibrous matrix of the calcium, magnesium-iron rich amphibole mineral series tremolite (calcium-magnesium)-ferroactinolite (calcium-magnesium-iron). The middle member of this series with an intermediate composition is called actinolite (the silky fibrous mineral form is one form of asbestos). The higher the iron content, the greener the colour. Tremolite occurs in metamorphosed dolomitic limestones, and actinolite in metamorphic greenschists/glaucophane schists.

Jadeite is a sodium- and aluminium-rich pyroxene. The more precious kind of jade, this is a microcrystalline interlocking growth of crystals (not a fibrous matrix as nephrite is.) It only occurs in metamorphic rocks.

Both nephrite and jadeite were used from prehistoric periods for hardstone carving. Jadeite has about the same hardness (between 6.0 and 7.0 Mohs hardness) as quartz, while nephrite is slightly softer (6.0 to 6.5) and so can be worked with quartz or garnet sand, and polished with bamboo or even ground jade. However nephrite is tougher and more resistant to breakage. Among the earliest known jade artifacts excavated from prehistoric sites are simple ornaments with bead, button, and tubular shapes. Additionally, jade was used for adze heads, knives, and other weapons, which can be delicately shaped.

As metal-working technologies became available, the beauty of jade made it valuable for ornaments and decorative objects.

=== Unusual varieties ===
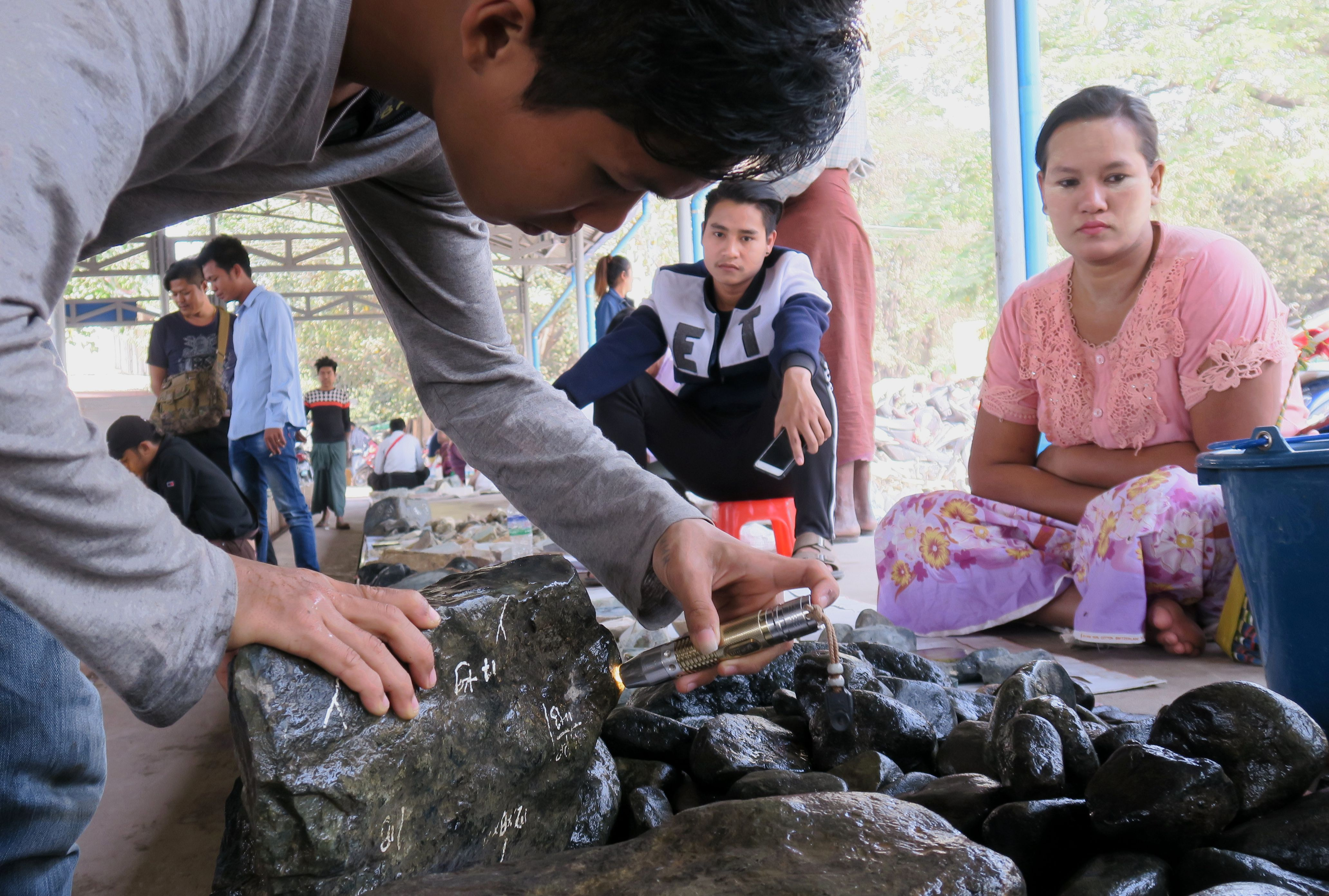
Jade rock inspection with a portable UV LED flashlight in Mandalay Jade Market, Myanmar.

The name nephrite derives from the Greek word meaning "kidney". This is because in ancient times it was believed that wearing this kind of jade around the waist could cure kidney disease.

Nephrite can be found in a creamy white form (known in China as "mutton fat" jade) as well as in a variety of light green colours, whereas jadeite shows more colour variations, including blue, brown, red, black, dark green, lavender and white. Of the two, jadeite is rarer, documented in fewer than 12 places worldwide. Translucent emerald-green jadeite is the most prized variety, both historically and today. As "quetzal" jade, bright green jadeite from Guatemala was treasured by Mesoamerican cultures, and as "kingfisher" jade, vivid green rocks from Burma became the preferred stone of post-1800 Chinese imperial scholars and rulers. Burma (Myanmar) and Guatemala are the principal sources of modern gem jadeite. In the area of Mogaung in the Myitkyina District of Upper Burma, jadeite formed a layer in the dark-green serpentine, and has been quarried and exported for well over a hundred years. Canada provides the major share of modern lapidary nephrite.

=== Enhancement ===
Jade may be enhanced (sometimes called "stabilized"). Some merchants will refer to these as grades, but degree of enhancement is different from colour and texture quality. In other words, Type A jadeite is not enhanced but can have poor colour and texture. There are three main methods of enhancement, sometimes referred to as the ABC Treatment System:

- Type A jadeite has not been treated in any way except surface waxing.
- Type B treatment involves exposing a promising but stained piece of jadeite to chemical bleaches and/or acids and impregnating it with a clear polymer resin. This results in a significant improvement of transparency and colour of the material. Currently, infrared spectroscopy is the most accurate test for the detection of polymer in jadeite.
- Type C jade has been artificially stained or dyed. The effects are somewhat uncontrollable and may result in a dull brown. In any case, translucency is usually lost.
- B+C jade is a combination of B and C: it has been both impregnated and artificially stained.
- Type D jade refers to a composite stone such as a doublet comprising a jade top with a plastic backing.

== Industry ==
=== Myanmar ===
The jade trade in Myanmar consists of the mining, distribution, and manufacture of jadeite—a variety of jade—in the nation of Myanmar (Burma). The jadeite deposits found in Myanmar's northern regions are the source of the highest quality jadeite in the world, noted by sources in China going as far back as the 10th century. Chinese culture places significant weight on the meaning of jade; as their influence has grown in Myanmar, so has the jade industry and the practice of exporting the precious mineral.

Myanmar produces upward of 70 percent of the world's supply of high-quality jadeite. Most of the Myanmar's jadeite is exported to other nations, primarily Asian, for use in jewellery, art, and ornaments. The majority of the production is carried out by Myanma Gem Enterprise (MGE), a state-owned venture which has enough liquid assets to run itself for 172 years.

== See also ==
- Cheonmachong – Tumulus of the Silla kingdom in Korea, containing jade artifacts
- Costa Rican jade tradition
- Jade burial suit – Ceremonial suit made of jade
- Jade trade in Myanmar
- Mumun pottery period – Time in Korea when jade ornament production began
- Pounamu – Type of hard stone found in New Zealand, some of which are nephrite
- Serpentine subgroup – Group of minerals, some of which are known as false jade
