= Hei matau =

Ornamental Māori fish-hook, for luck

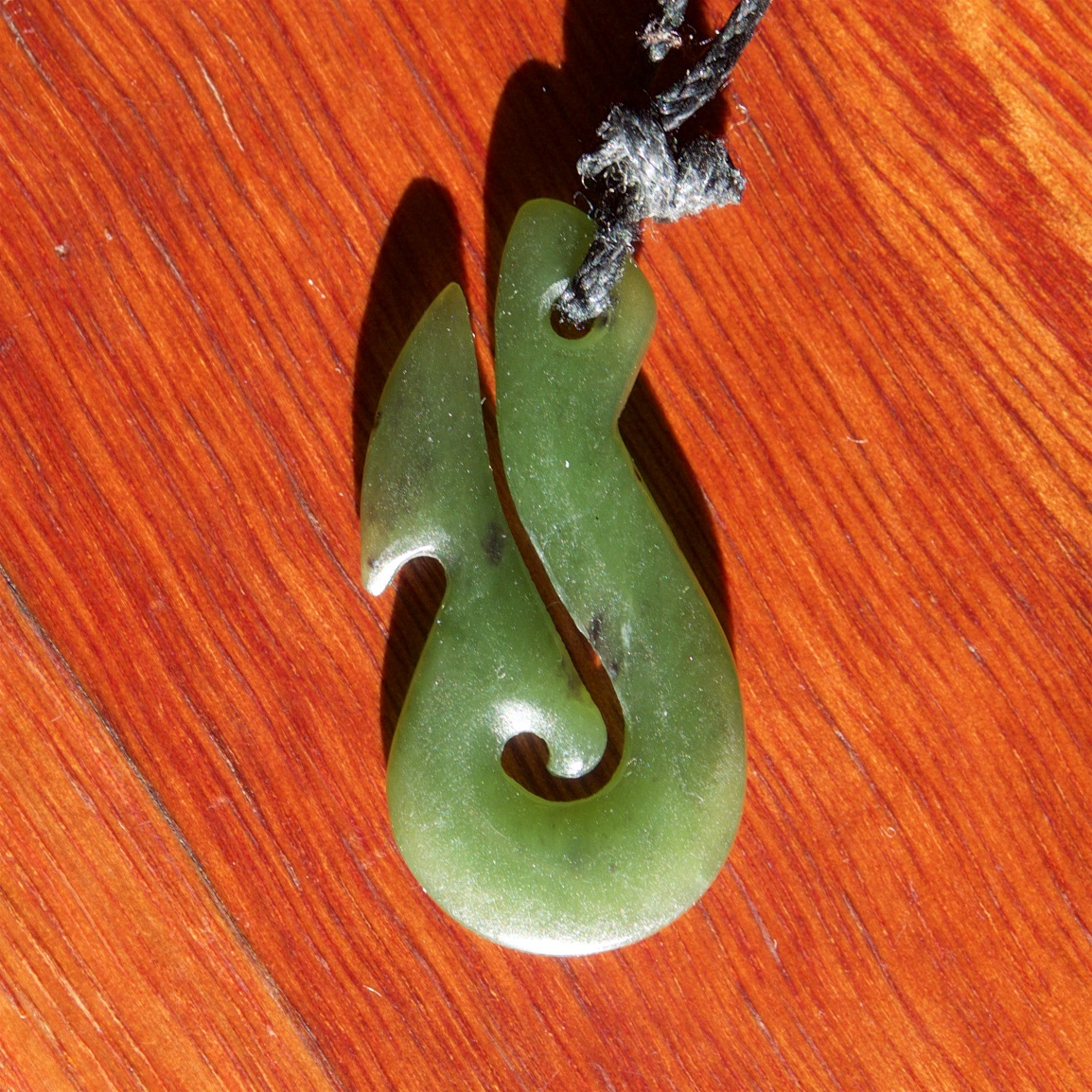
A typical design of a Māori hei matau

A hei matau is a bone or greenstone carving in the shape of a highly stylised fish hook. They represent good luck and safe travel across water.

== Meaning ==
The fish-hook shape of the hei matau means to know, which holds that the North Island of New Zealand was once a huge fish that was caught by the great mariner Māui using only a woven line and a hook made from the jawbone of his grandmother. Legend holds that the shape of Hawkes Bay is that of the hei matau, which caught in the fish's side on the beach. The Māori name for the North island, Te Ika a Māui ("The fish of Māui") reflects this legend.

For the Māori, the hei matau is taonga (a cultural treasure). It represents not only their land, but also prosperity, fertility, and safe passage over water. They also denote the importance of fishing to Māori, and their relationship to Tangaroa god of the sea.

== Materials and methods ==
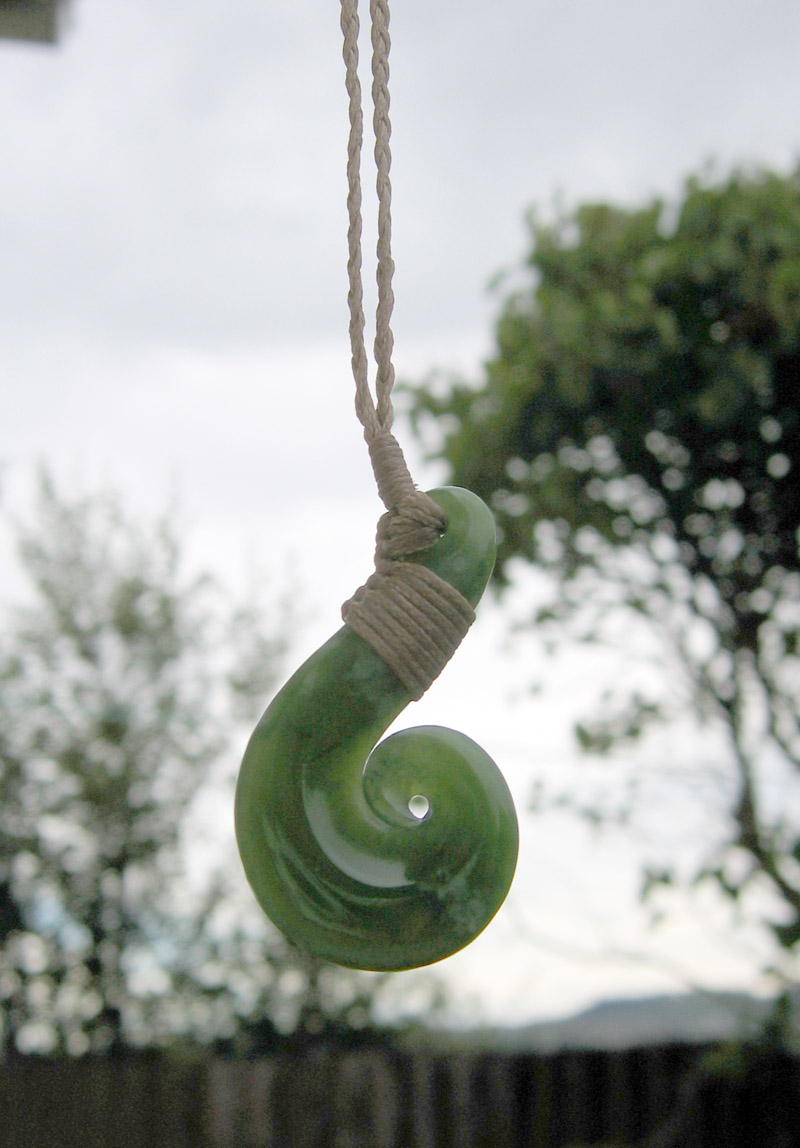
Modern hei matau, made of pounamu

Traditionally, matau, or fishhooks, were carved from bone, ivory, shell, wood, or pounamu; composite hooks were also common. They came in several different forms. There are multiple apparently functional matau forms, but the functions of some are not known. Some were plain and utilitarian; others highly ornate. They were worn as pendants for safekeeping, and were often treasured family heirlooms.

Today, their main use is ornamental and they are commonly worn around the neck not only by Māori, but also by other New Zealanders who identify with the hei matau as a symbol of New Zealand. They are also popular items on the tourist market. Many modern pendants are not functional fish hooks.

In contemporary times, hei matau are commonly carved from cattle bone. Some Māori carvers continue to use whale bone, and such pieces are highly valued not only because of the beauty of whale bone and its cultural and historical significance, but also its scarcity. Current laws against hunting whales mean that Māori bone-carvers who carve in whale bone must use a combination of ancient standings or pre-existing supplies, or bones from whales that have recently beached. According to New Zealand tradition and law, Māori have first claim on part of the skeletons of any whales which strand and cannot be refloated. This is, however, a very limited supply.

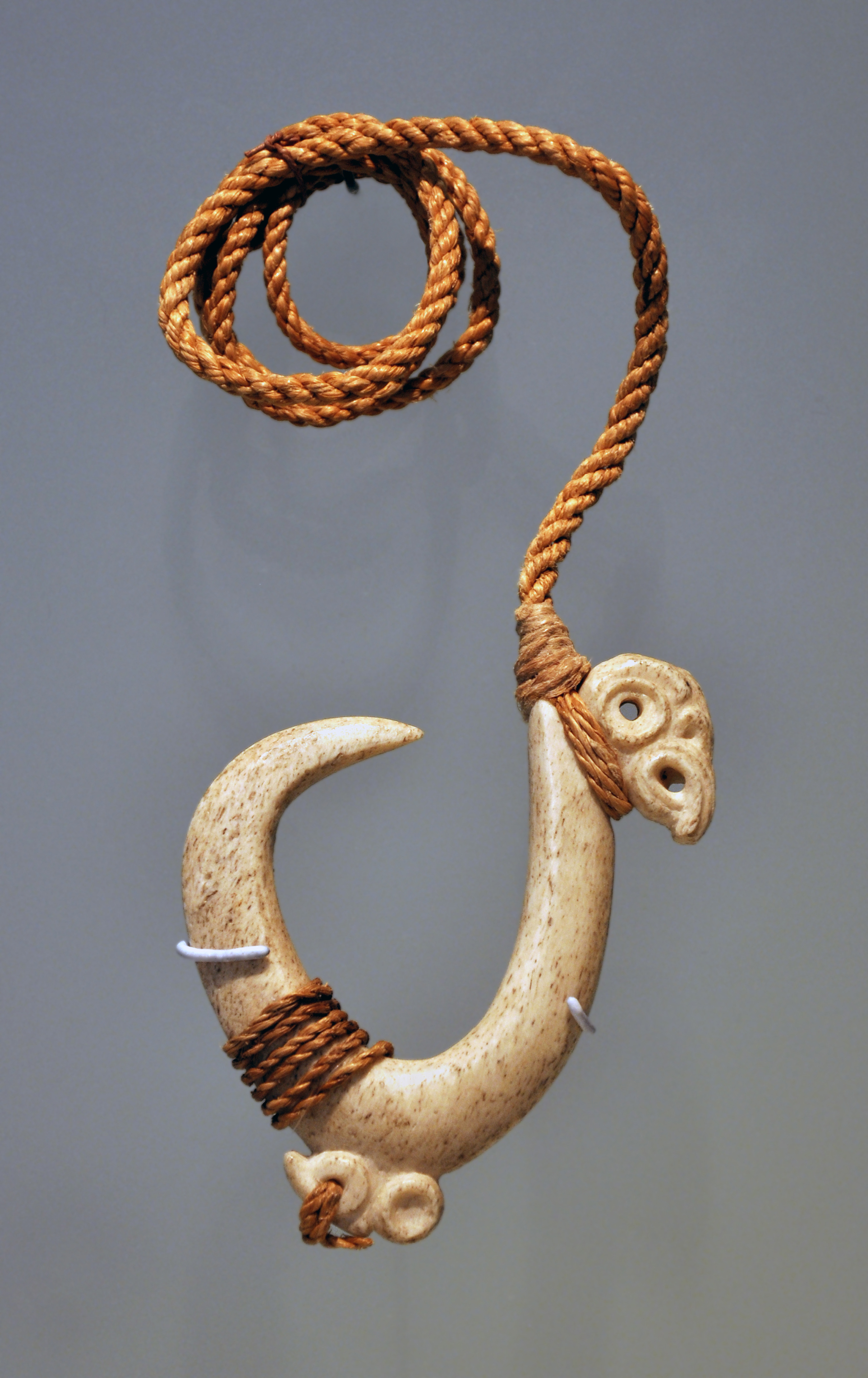
Bone matau, a functional circle fishhook

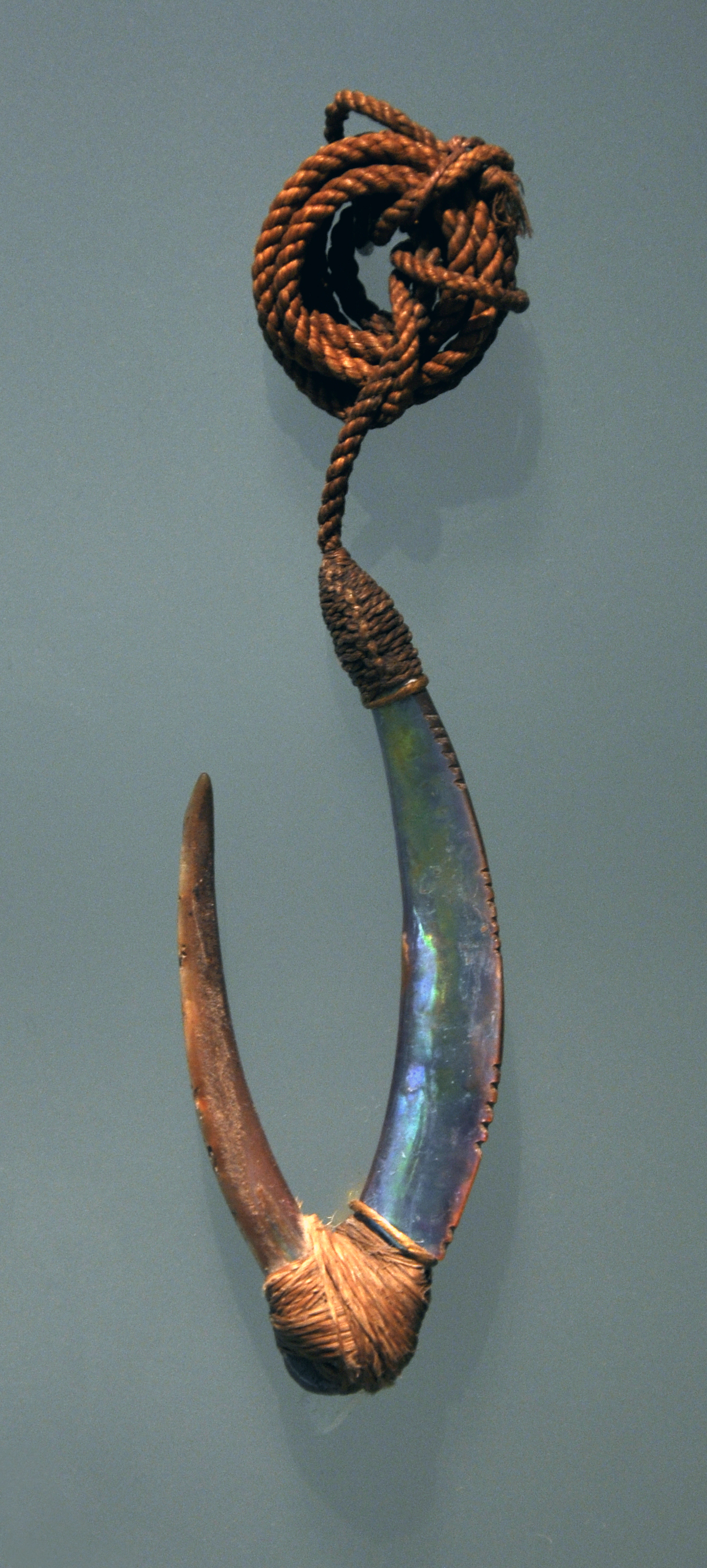
Wood and pāua shell matau, with the iridescent shell forming an integrated lure

=== Mass production ===
Manufacturers in China mass-produce items resembling hei matau for sale on the New Zealand tourist market. These are usually made of a paste of bone and resin. Such manufacturers have attracted criticism for their appropriation of Māori designs.

== See also ==
- Hei-tiki, ornamental Māori pendant
- Manaia, Māori mythological creature, symbol of protection
