= Pounamu =

Hard, green minerals in New Zealand culture

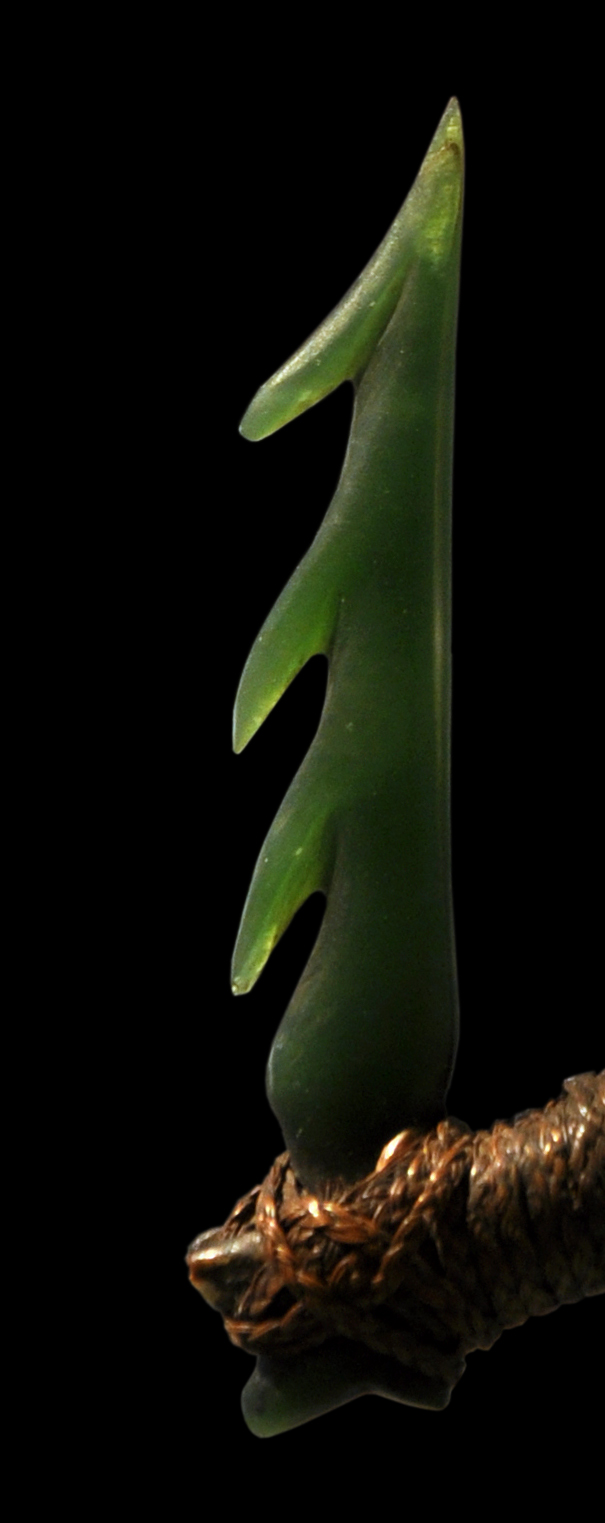
Pounamu matau barb

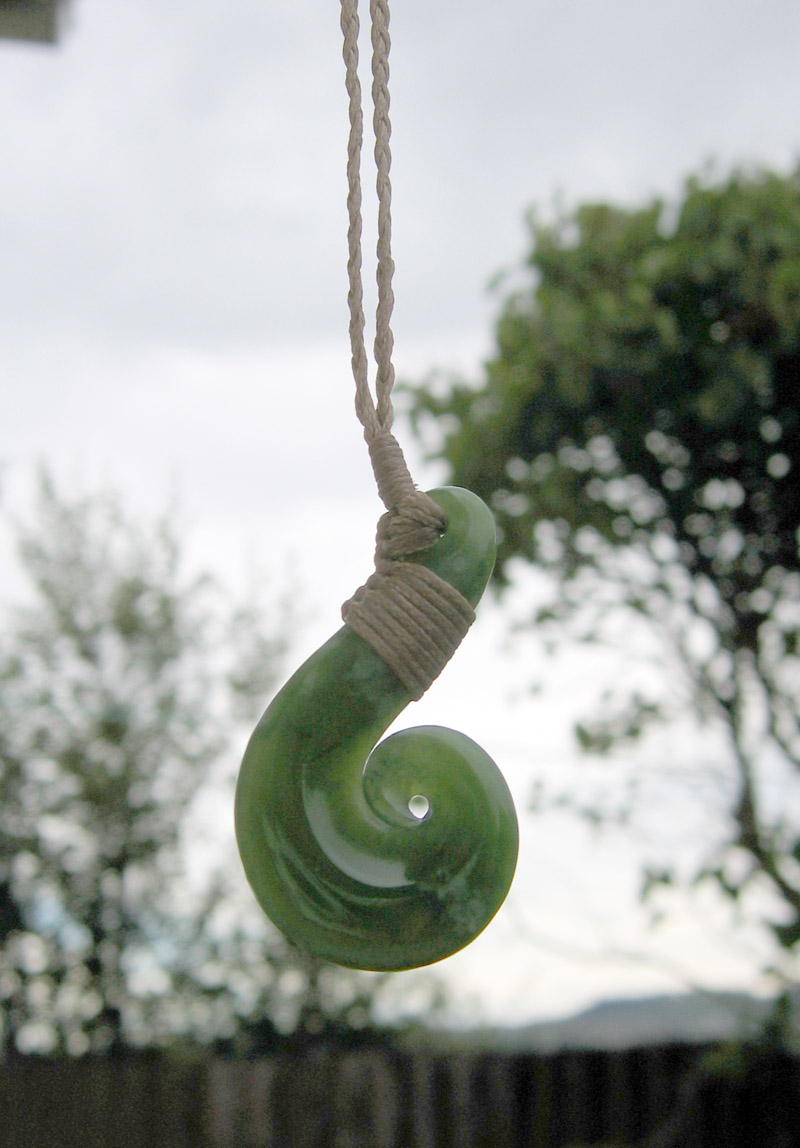
Pounamu hei matau pendant, a heavily stylised fishhook

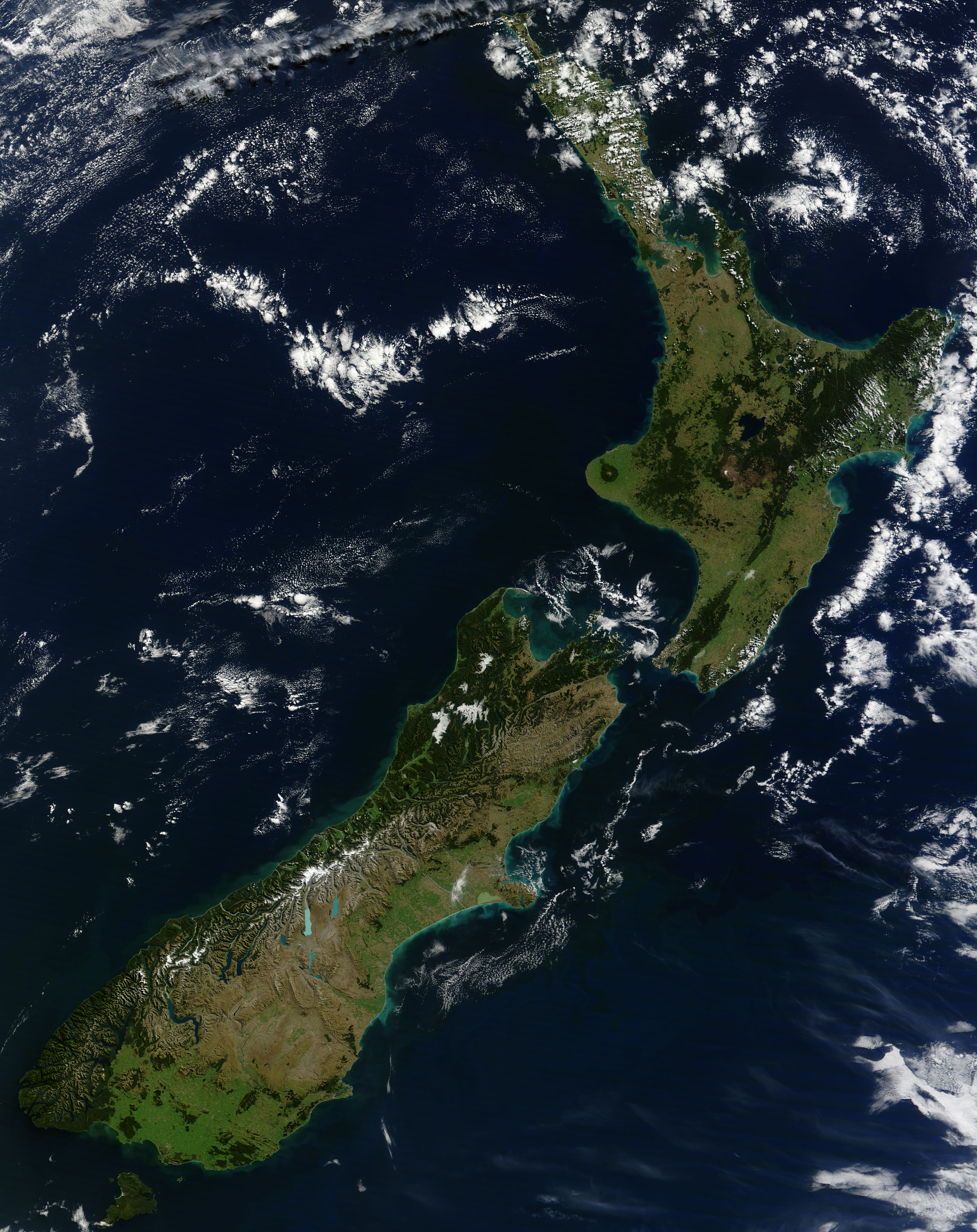
The Māori name for the South Island of New Zealand is Te Wai Pounamu ("The greenstone waters"), after its deposits of greenstone. The west coast area of the island resembles greenstone in this view from space.

Pounamu (occasionally historically spelt poenamu) is a term for several types of hard and durable stone found in the South Island of New Zealand, the most predominant of which is nephrite jade. They are highly valued in New Zealand, and regarded as taonga (cultural treasures) by Māori. Carvings made from pounamu play an important role in Māori culture.

== Name ==
The Māori word pounamu is derived from namu, an archaic word that describes blue-green (or 'grue') cognate with Tahitian ninamu. Pounamu, also used in New Zealand English, in itself refers to two main types of green stone valued for carving: nephrite jade, classified by Māori as kawakawa, kahurangi, īnanga, and other names depending on colour; and translucent bowenite, a type of serpentine, known as tangiwai. The collective term pounamu is preferred, as the other names in common use are misleading, such as New Zealand jade (not all pounamu is jade) and greenstone (a generic term used for unrelated stone from many countries). Pounamu is only found in New Zealand, whereas much of the carved "greenstone" sold in souvenir shops is jade sourced overseas.

The Māori classification of pounamu is by colour and appearance; the shade of green is matched against a colour found in nature, and some hues contain flecks of red or brown.

- Īnanga pounamu takes its name from the native freshwater fish Galaxias maculatus, one of the common whitebait species in New Zealand, and is pearly-white or grey-green in colour. It varies from translucent to opaque. Īnanga was the variety most prized by Māori for ornaments and mere (short handled clubs).
- Kahurangi pounamu is highly translucent and has a vivid shade of light green with no spots or flaws. Its name is the Māori word for a person of high rank, and is the rarest variety of pounamu. It was the preferred stone for making toki poutangata (ceremonial adzes) owned by rangatira (Māori chiefs).
- Kawakawa pounamu comes shades of rich dark green, often with small dark flecks or inclusions, and is named after the similarly coloured leaves of the kawakawa tree (Piper excelsum). It is the most common variety of pounamu, and the most used in the manufacture of jewellery today. One of its main sources is the Taramakau River on the West Coast.
  - Totoweka is a rare type of kawakawa with small reddish dots or streaks; its name means "weka blood" after the flightless bird Gallirallus australis.
- Kōkopu pounamu is olive green and speckled with dark spots, reminiscent of the markings of three species of native freshwater fishes in the genus Galaxias that go by that name.
- Flower jade or picture jade is pounamu with cream, yellow, or brown inclusions, from oxidising or weathering in the surface of the stone. Cracks or fissures in the stone can allow iron impurities to enter, and carvers can then make use of the resulting patterns. Flower jade is best known from the Marsden district near Hokitika.
- Tangiwai pounamu is translucent like glass, but in a wide range of shades. When viewed against the light it resembles a clear drop of water. The name means "the tears that come from great sorrow", and refers to a Māori legend of a lamenting woman whose tears turned to stone.

== Chemistry ==
Jade is formed from two different stones: jadeite and nephrite. Jadeite (sodium aluminium silicate) has interlocking granular crystals, while nephrite (calcium magnesium silicate) has crystals that are interwoven and fibrous. Jadeite is mostly found in Myanmar, while nephrite is found in Europe, British Columbia, Australia, and New Zealand. New Zealand nephrite contains varying amounts of iron, which account for its range of shades, richness of green, and translucency.

== Geological formation and location ==
Pounamu is generally found in rivers in specific parts of the South Island as nondescript boulders and stones. Pounamu has been formed in New Zealand in four main locations; the West Coast, Fiordland, western Southland and the Nelson district. It is typically recovered from rivers and beaches where it has been transported to after being eroded from the mountains. The group of rocks where pounamu comes from are called ophiolites. Ophiolites are slices of the deep ocean crust and part of the mantle. When these deep mantle rocks (serpentinite) and crustal rock (mafic igneous rocks) are heated up (metamorphosed) together, pounamu can be formed at their contact.

The Dun Mountain Ophiolite Belt has been metamorphosed in western Southland and pounamu from this belt is found along the eastern and northern edge of Fiordland. The Anita Bay Dunite near Milford Sound is a small but highly prized source of pounamu. In the Southern Alps, the Pounamu Ultramafic Belt in the Haast Schist occurs as isolated pods which are eroded and found on West Coast rivers and beaches.

One source of īnanga pounamu at the head of Lake Wakatipu is possibly the only jade mining site in the world with Government protection.

== Significance to Māori ==
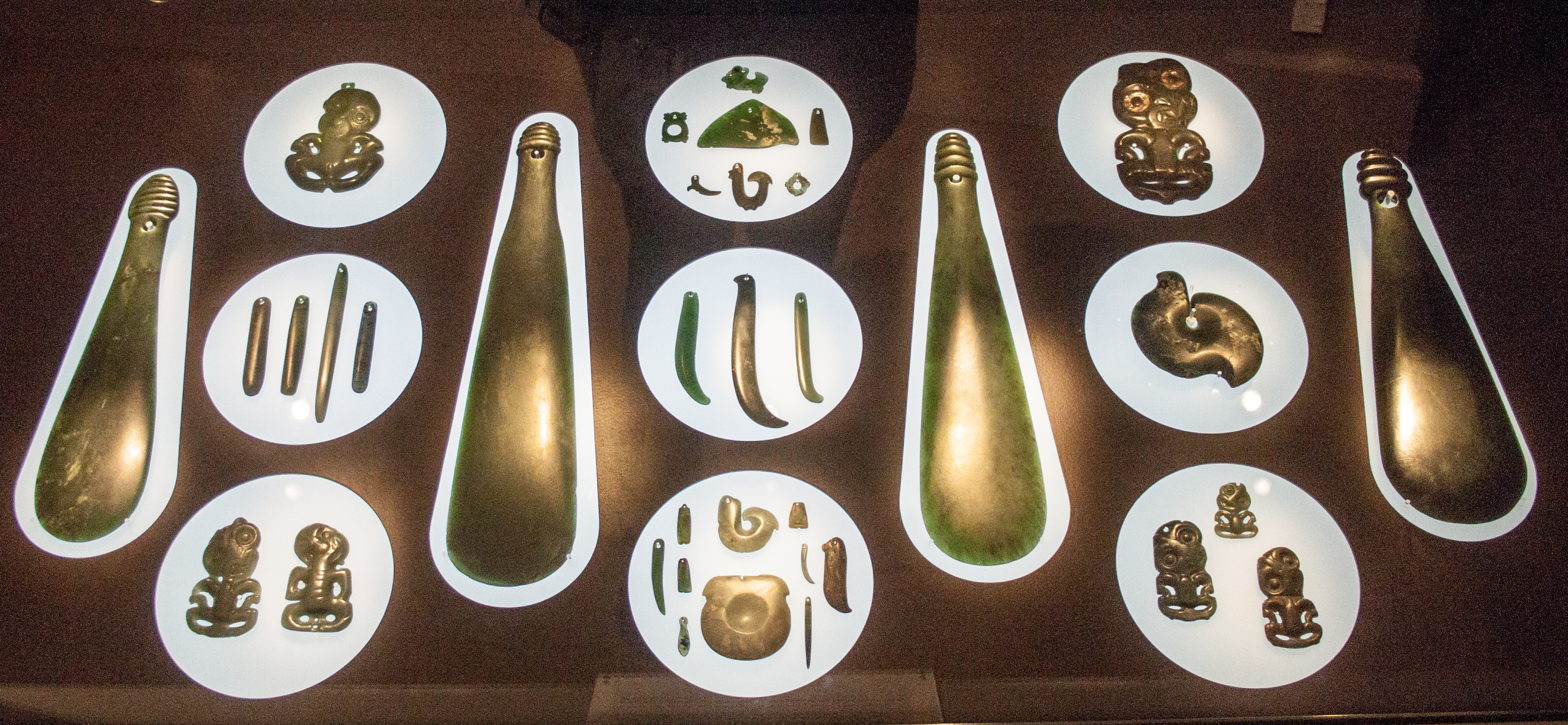
A wide range of pounamu objects

Pounamu plays a very important role in Māori culture and is a taonga (treasure). It is and has been an important part of trade between the South Island iwi (tribe) Ngāi Tahu and other iwi. Adze blades made from pounamu were desired for carving of wood, and even with the arrival of metal tools pounamu tools were used. These were often reworked into hei tiki (stylised human figures worn as pendants) and other taonga when they were no longer useful for carving wood. After the arrival of Ngāi Tahu in the South Island in the middle of the 18th century, the production of pounamu increased. Pounamu crafting and trade was important to the economy of Ngāi Tahu.

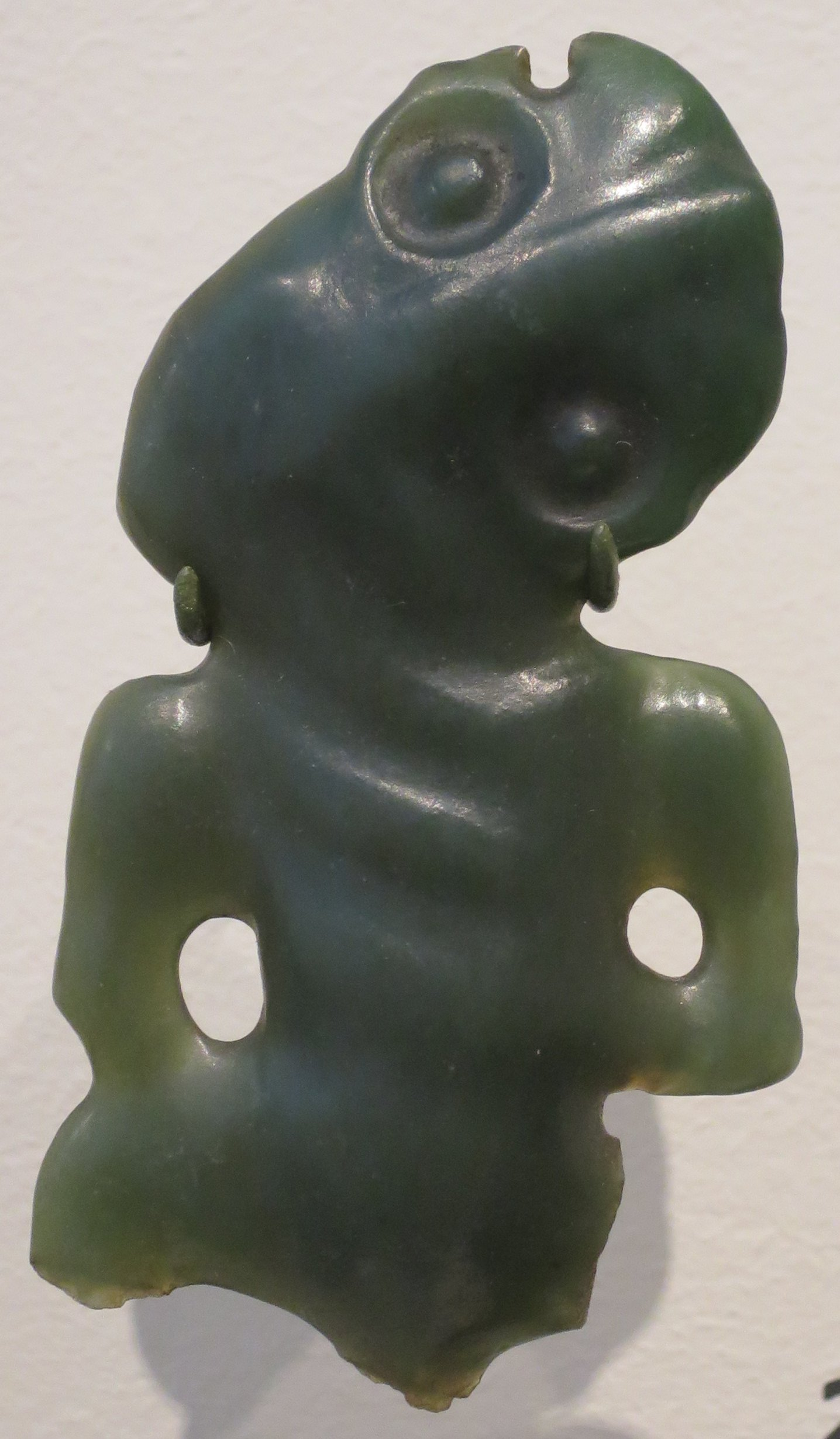
Hei tiki; signs of wear indicate longevity of active possession due to the hard nature of the stone.

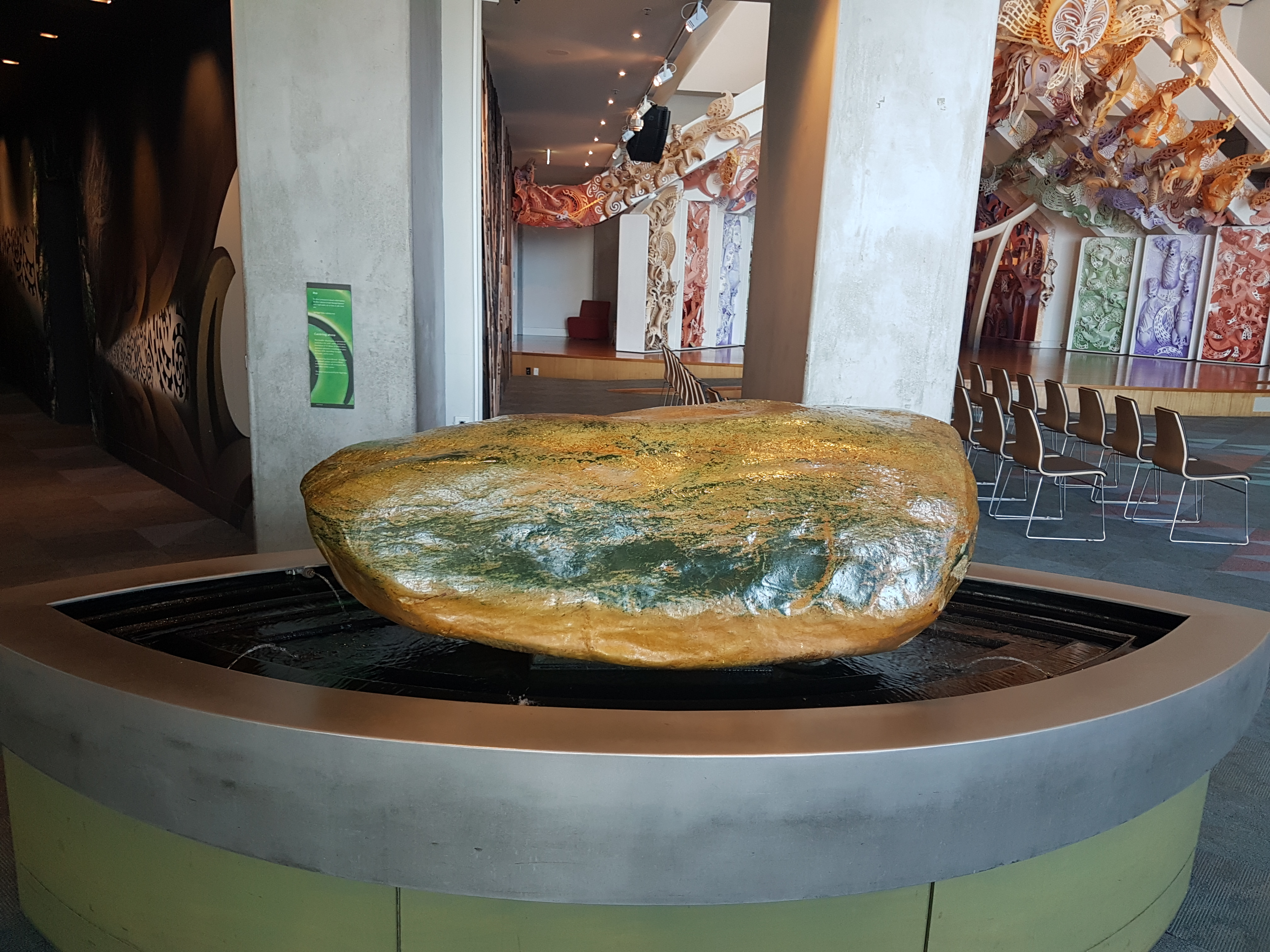
Large pounamu boulder at Te Papa Tongarewa o Aotearoa

Pounamu taonga increase in mana (spiritual power or prestige) as they pass from one generation to another. Pounamu is believed to absorb the mana of its past owners, and some heirloom pieces are named after a former owner in memory of their position and authority. The most prized taonga are those with known histories going back many generations: these are believed to have their own mana and were often given as gifts to seal important agreements.

Pounamu taonga include tools such as toki (adzes), whao (chisels), whao whakakōka (gouges), ripi pounamu (knives), scrapers, awls, hammer stones, and drill points. Hunting tools include matau (fishing hooks) and lures, spear points, and kākā poria (leg rings for fastening captive birds); weapons such as mere; and ornaments such as pendants (hei tiki, hei matau and pekapeka), ear pendants (kuru and kapeu), and cloak pins. Functional pounamu tools were widely worn for both practical and ornamental reasons, and continued to be worn as purely ornamental pendants (hei kakī) even after they were no longer used as tools.

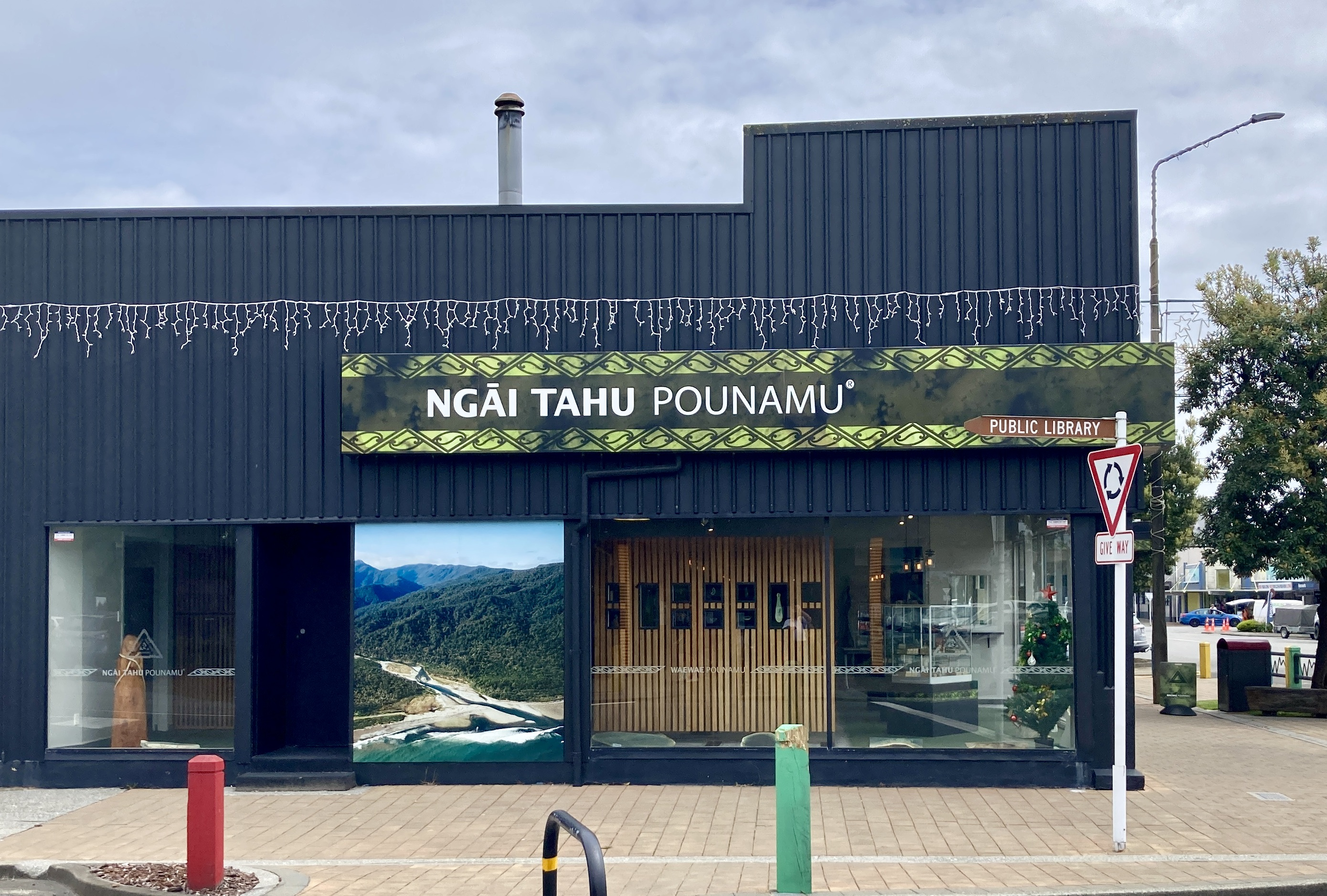
Store selling carved pounamu in Hokitika, New Zealand

Pounamu is found only in the South Island of New Zealand, known in Māori as Te Wai Pounamu ('The [land of] Greenstone Water') or Te Wahi Pounamu ('The Place of Greenstone'). In 1997 the Crown handed back the ownership of all naturally occurring pounamu to the South Island iwi Ngāi Tahu (or Kāi Tahu), as part of the Ngāi Tahu Claims Settlement.

Pounamu was of such value to Māori that peace was cemented by the exchange of valuable carved heirlooms, creating what was figuratively called a tautau pounamu (door of greenstone), as in the saying Me tautau pounamu, kia kore ai e pakaru, ake, ake (Let conclude a peace treaty that may never be broken, for ever and ever).

Large pounamu boulders were and still are placed at the entrances to significant cultural sites as mauri stones (touchstones), connecting visitors to the strength and significance of the site. Visitors are invited to gently rub the stone with a dry or wet hand to connect with its mana.

=== Pounamu trails ===
There were a dozen major pounamu trails used in the trading of pounamu and many more minor routes. Parties of 6 to 12 are thought to have used the tracks in summer, particularly via Harper Pass.

== Modern use ==
Jewellery and other decorative items made from gold and pounamu were particularly fashionable in New Zealand in the Victorian and Edwardian years in the late 19th and early 20th century. It continues to be popular among New Zealanders and is often given as gifts. In 2011, the New Zealand Prime Minister John Key presented the President of the United States, Barack Obama with a wahaika (a type of Māori weapon) created from pounamu carved by New Zealand artist Aden Hoglund.

An exhibition curated by Te Papa in 2007 called Kura Pounamu showcased 200 pounamu items from their collections and linked New Zealand and China through both the geographical location of nephrite and also the high level of artistry achieved in ancient China and then thousands of years later amongst Māori. The exhibition marked 40 years of diplomatic relations between countries when it toured to five venues in China in 2013.

In the 2016 animated movie Moana, the central premise is to return the stolen heart of Te Fiti which is manifest in a pounamu stone amulet.

Fossicking for Pounamu is a cultural activity in New Zealand and allowed on designated areas of the West Coast of the South Island (Te Tai o Poutini) and is limited to what can be carried unaided. Fossicking elsewhere in the Kāi Tahu tribal area is illegal, while nephrite jade can be sourced legally and freely from Marlborough and Nelson. In 2009, David Anthony Saxton and his son Morgan David Saxton were sentenced to two and a half years imprisonment for stealing greenstone with a helicopter from the southern West Coast.

== Gallery ==
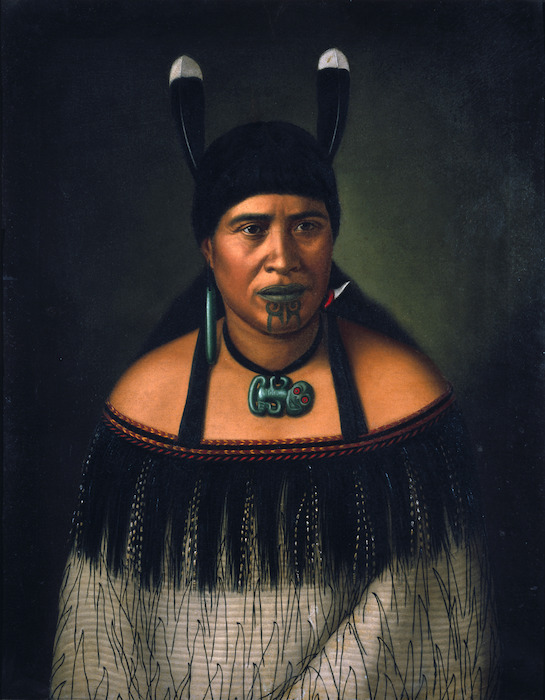
Hinepare, a woman of the Ngāti Kahungunu tribe. She is wearing a pounamu hei-tiki around her neck, and one pounamu earring and one shark tooth earring

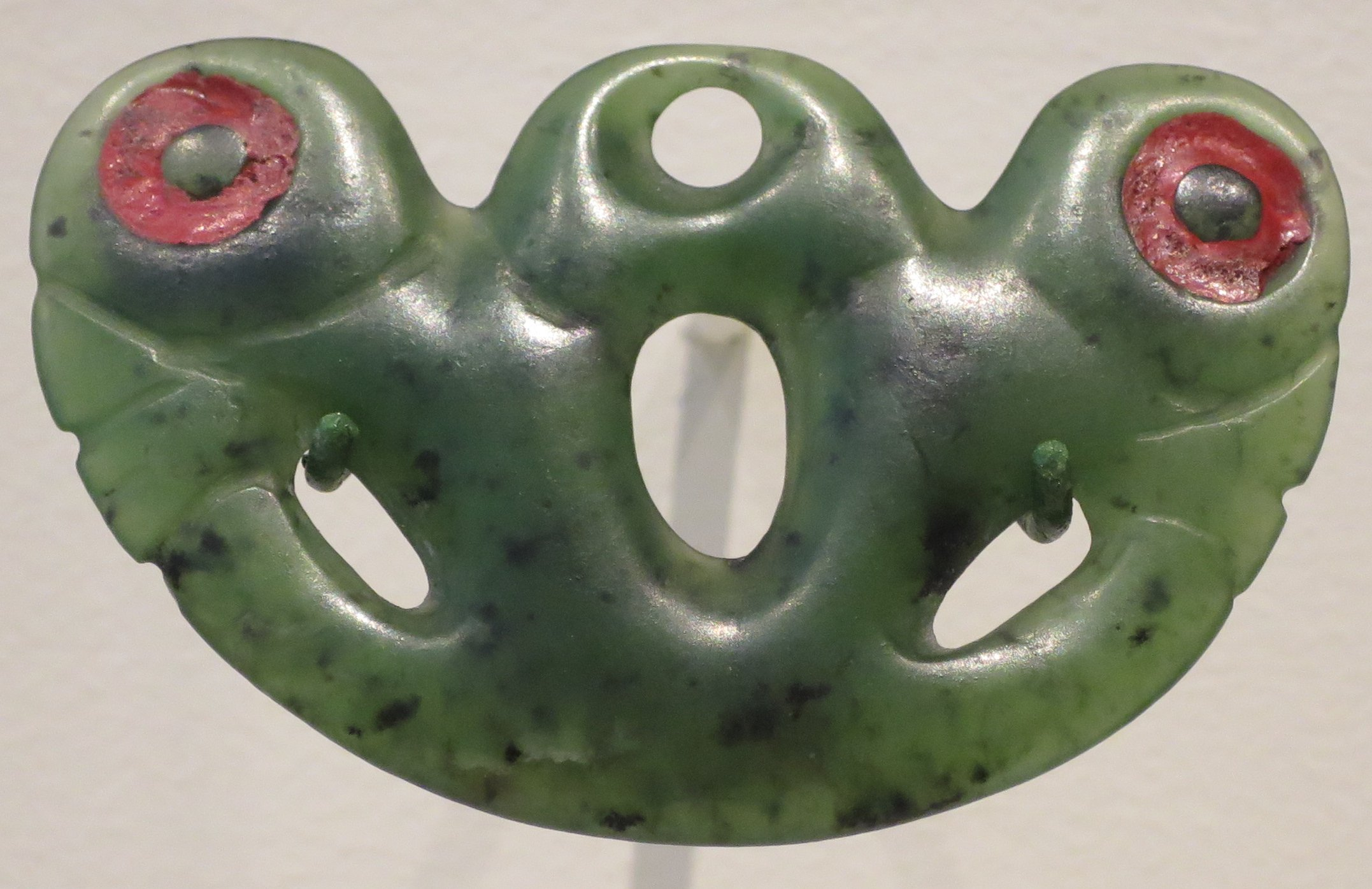
Ear pendant (pekapeka), Māori people, pounamu and red sealing wax

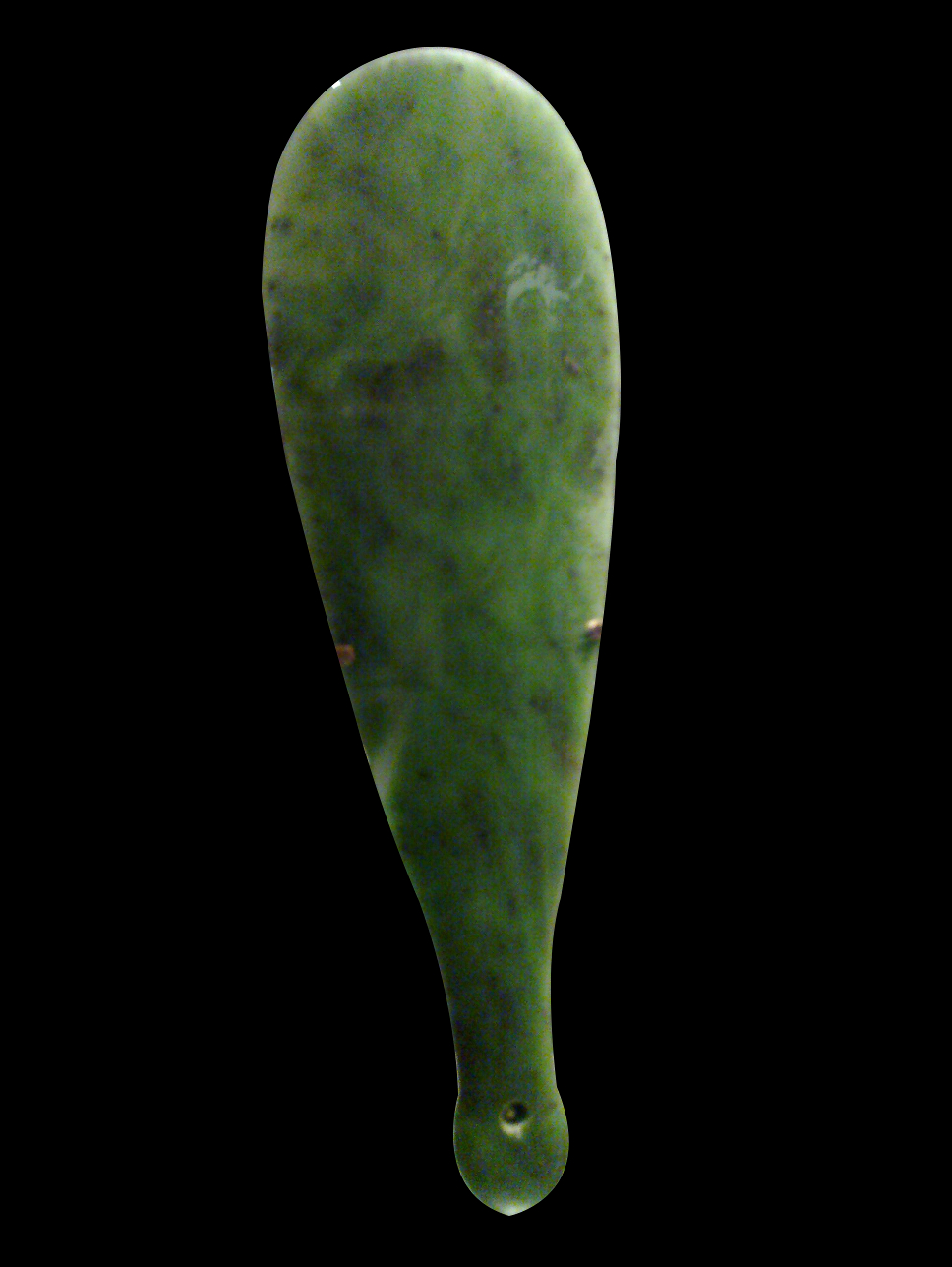
Kataore, a mere pounamu (42 cm × 12 cm, 16.5 in × 4.7 in) named after a Ngāi Tahu chief killed by Te Rauparaha in the 1830s. Gifted by Riwai Te Ahu to Sir George Grey.

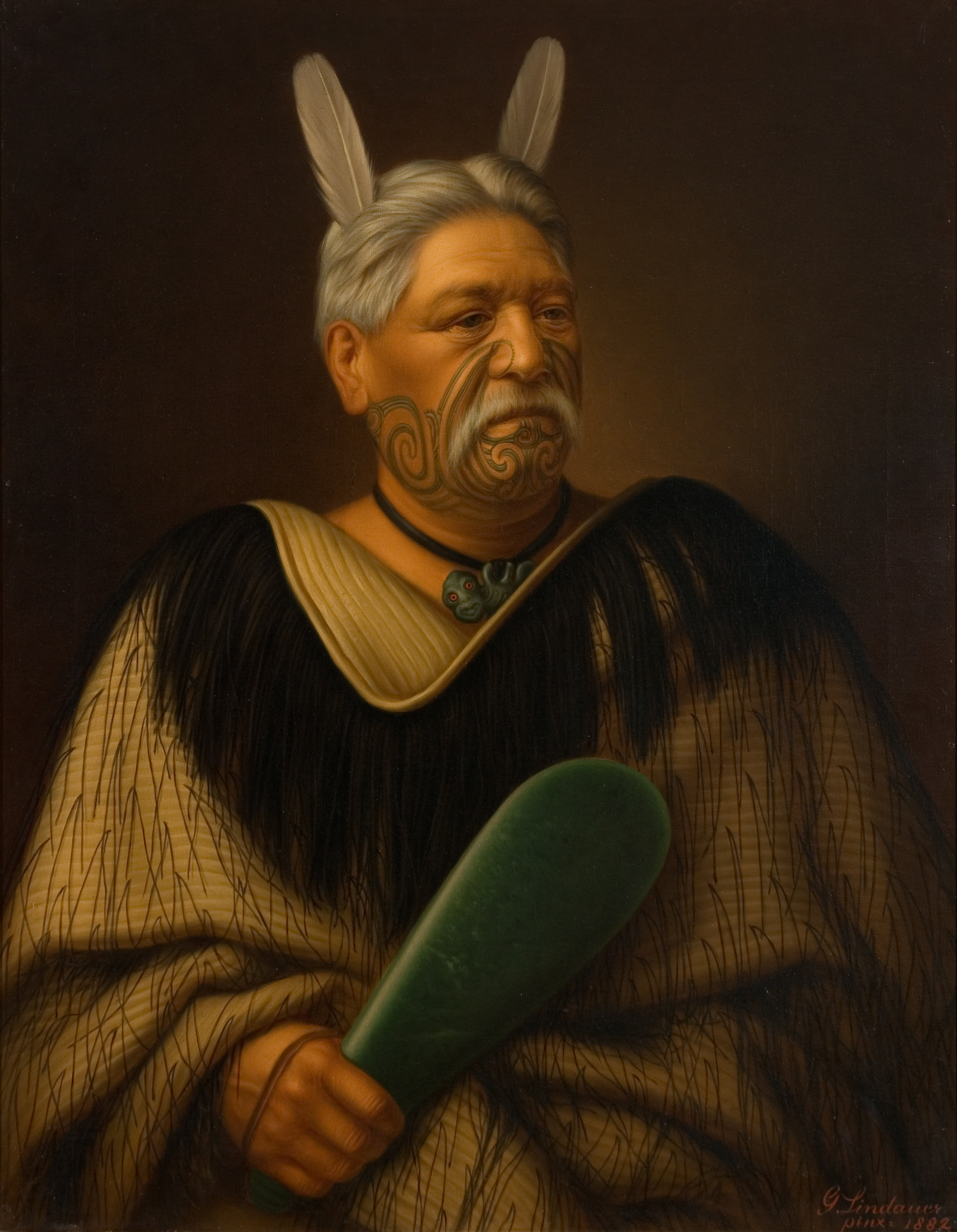
A portrait of Wahanui Reihana Te Huatare carrying a mere and wearing a hei-tiki made of pounamu

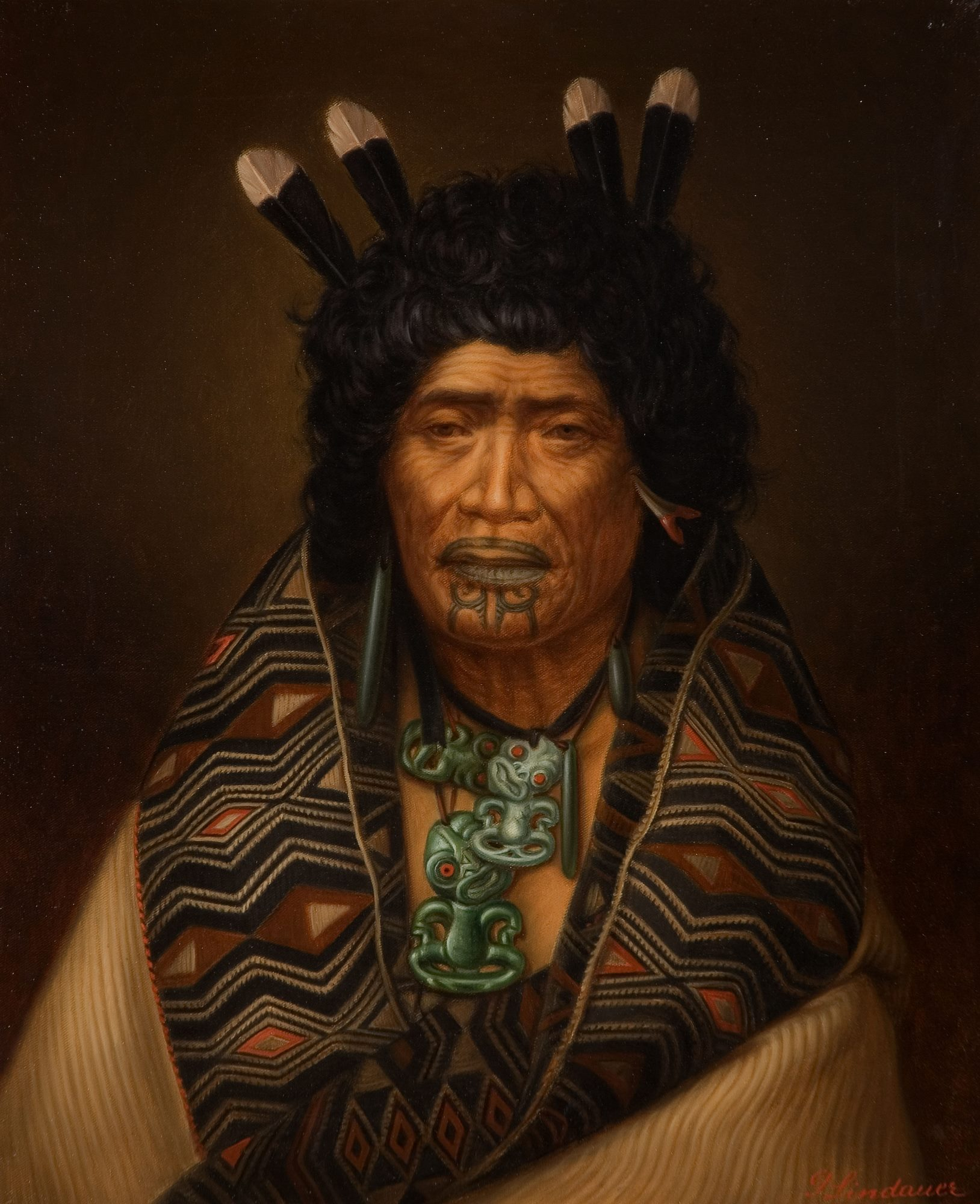
A portrait of Rangi Topeora, wearing numerous pounamu items.

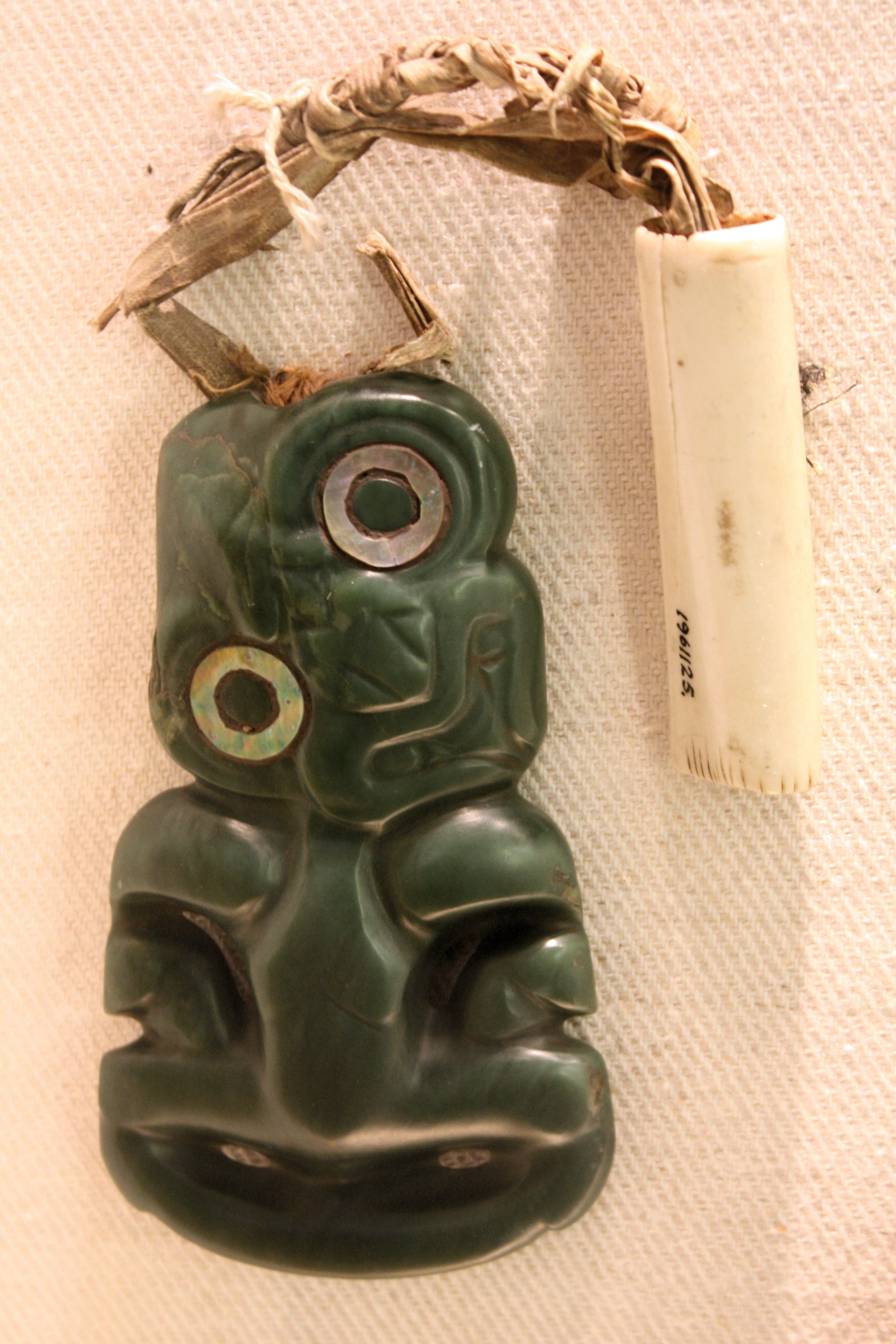
Nephrite pounamu hei-tiki

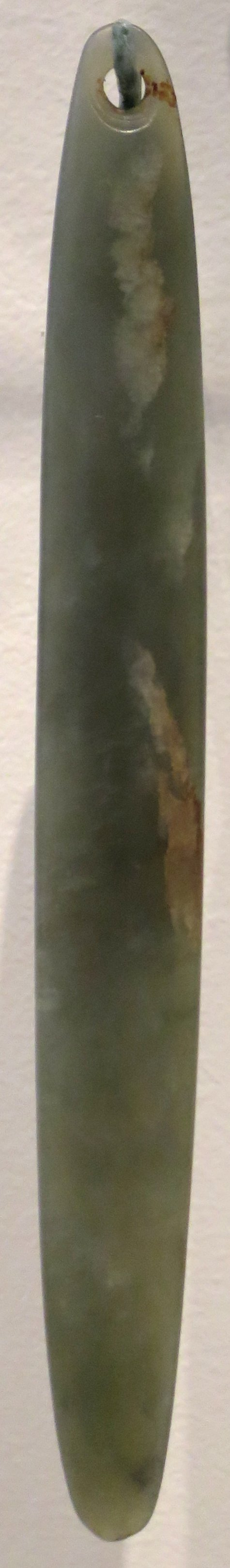
A kuru (straight earring). Kapeu are similar, but with curved ends, and are also used as teething aids.

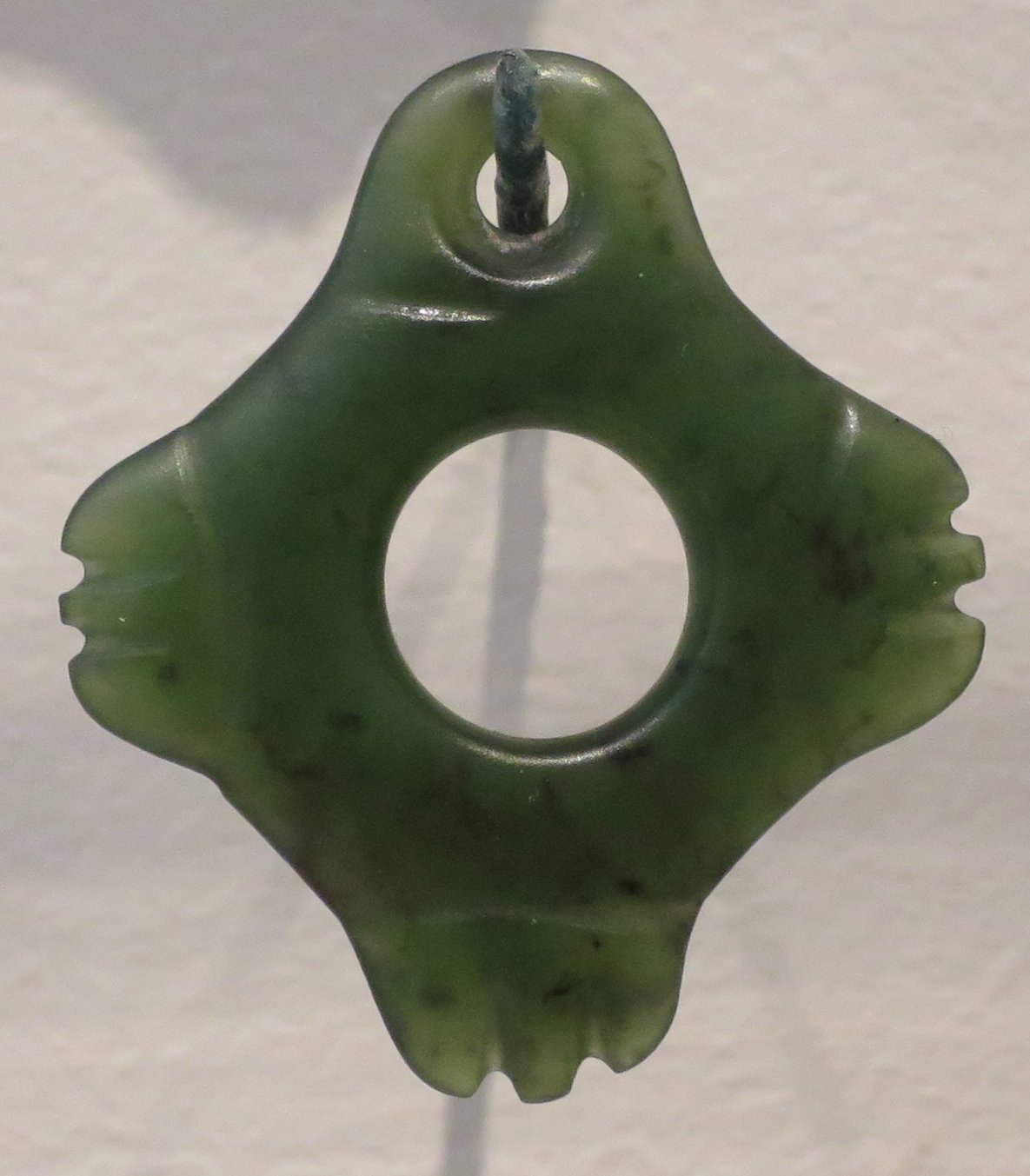
A kākā pōria, a bird leg ring used to fasten decoy birds used in hunting.

== See also ==
- Greenstone (disambiguation)
- Hei-tiki
- Lingling-o
